

443001–443100 

|-bgcolor=#d6d6d6
| 443001 ||  || — || February 22, 2007 || Kitt Peak || Spacewatch || — || align=right | 3.1 km || 
|-id=002 bgcolor=#d6d6d6
| 443002 ||  || — || June 1, 2010 || WISE || WISE || — || align=right | 2.9 km || 
|-id=003 bgcolor=#E9E9E9
| 443003 ||  || — || April 2, 2009 || Kitt Peak || Spacewatch || — || align=right | 1.8 km || 
|-id=004 bgcolor=#d6d6d6
| 443004 ||  || — || February 8, 2008 || Kitt Peak || Spacewatch || EOS || align=right | 1.8 km || 
|-id=005 bgcolor=#E9E9E9
| 443005 ||  || — || September 30, 2003 || Kitt Peak || Spacewatch || (5) || align=right data-sort-value="0.60" | 600 m || 
|-id=006 bgcolor=#d6d6d6
| 443006 ||  || — || August 1, 2010 || WISE || WISE || Tj (2.99) || align=right | 5.0 km || 
|-id=007 bgcolor=#d6d6d6
| 443007 ||  || — || November 18, 2011 || Mount Lemmon || Mount Lemmon Survey || EOS || align=right | 2.2 km || 
|-id=008 bgcolor=#d6d6d6
| 443008 ||  || — || November 30, 2011 || Mount Lemmon || Mount Lemmon Survey || — || align=right | 2.3 km || 
|-id=009 bgcolor=#E9E9E9
| 443009 ||  || — || September 14, 1998 || Socorro || LINEAR || — || align=right | 1.8 km || 
|-id=010 bgcolor=#d6d6d6
| 443010 ||  || — || November 19, 2006 || Kitt Peak || Spacewatch || HYG || align=right | 2.1 km || 
|-id=011 bgcolor=#E9E9E9
| 443011 ||  || — || May 6, 2005 || Kitt Peak || Spacewatch || — || align=right | 1.5 km || 
|-id=012 bgcolor=#d6d6d6
| 443012 ||  || — || September 3, 2010 || Mount Lemmon || Mount Lemmon Survey || EOS || align=right | 1.9 km || 
|-id=013 bgcolor=#d6d6d6
| 443013 ||  || — || September 1, 2010 || Mount Lemmon || Mount Lemmon Survey || — || align=right | 3.1 km || 
|-id=014 bgcolor=#E9E9E9
| 443014 ||  || — || December 5, 2008 || Kitt Peak || Spacewatch || — || align=right data-sort-value="0.88" | 880 m || 
|-id=015 bgcolor=#E9E9E9
| 443015 ||  || — || February 3, 2009 || Mount Lemmon || Mount Lemmon Survey || — || align=right | 1.4 km || 
|-id=016 bgcolor=#d6d6d6
| 443016 ||  || — || January 31, 2008 || Kitt Peak || Spacewatch || — || align=right | 2.7 km || 
|-id=017 bgcolor=#d6d6d6
| 443017 ||  || — || March 1, 2008 || Kitt Peak || Spacewatch || — || align=right | 3.6 km || 
|-id=018 bgcolor=#d6d6d6
| 443018 ||  || — || September 29, 2005 || Kitt Peak || Spacewatch || — || align=right | 2.8 km || 
|-id=019 bgcolor=#d6d6d6
| 443019 ||  || — || January 28, 2007 || Kitt Peak || Spacewatch || — || align=right | 4.5 km || 
|-id=020 bgcolor=#d6d6d6
| 443020 ||  || — || June 28, 2010 || WISE || WISE || — || align=right | 4.6 km || 
|-id=021 bgcolor=#d6d6d6
| 443021 ||  || — || March 11, 2008 || Kitt Peak || Spacewatch || EOS || align=right | 1.6 km || 
|-id=022 bgcolor=#d6d6d6
| 443022 ||  || — || November 20, 2006 || Kitt Peak || Spacewatch || KOR || align=right | 1.4 km || 
|-id=023 bgcolor=#d6d6d6
| 443023 ||  || — || February 16, 2013 || Kitt Peak || Spacewatch || 7:4* || align=right | 2.8 km || 
|-id=024 bgcolor=#d6d6d6
| 443024 ||  || — || September 25, 2005 || Kitt Peak || Spacewatch || — || align=right | 2.4 km || 
|-id=025 bgcolor=#d6d6d6
| 443025 ||  || — || March 12, 2008 || Mount Lemmon || Mount Lemmon Survey || EOS || align=right | 1.8 km || 
|-id=026 bgcolor=#E9E9E9
| 443026 ||  || — || January 15, 2008 || Kitt Peak || Spacewatch || GEF || align=right | 1.1 km || 
|-id=027 bgcolor=#d6d6d6
| 443027 ||  || — || May 25, 2006 || Kitt Peak || Spacewatch || 3:2 || align=right | 4.0 km || 
|-id=028 bgcolor=#E9E9E9
| 443028 ||  || — || February 16, 2004 || Kitt Peak || Spacewatch || ADE || align=right | 1.8 km || 
|-id=029 bgcolor=#E9E9E9
| 443029 ||  || — || December 30, 2007 || Kitt Peak || Spacewatch || — || align=right | 2.5 km || 
|-id=030 bgcolor=#d6d6d6
| 443030 ||  || — || October 20, 2006 || Kitt Peak || Spacewatch || KOR || align=right | 1.8 km || 
|-id=031 bgcolor=#d6d6d6
| 443031 ||  || — || November 1, 2005 || Mount Lemmon || Mount Lemmon Survey || — || align=right | 4.1 km || 
|-id=032 bgcolor=#d6d6d6
| 443032 ||  || — || October 3, 2010 || Kitt Peak || Spacewatch || — || align=right | 3.0 km || 
|-id=033 bgcolor=#d6d6d6
| 443033 ||  || — || February 14, 2013 || Catalina || CSS || — || align=right | 3.1 km || 
|-id=034 bgcolor=#d6d6d6
| 443034 ||  || — || September 14, 2010 || Kitt Peak || Spacewatch || — || align=right | 3.0 km || 
|-id=035 bgcolor=#E9E9E9
| 443035 ||  || — || May 4, 1995 || Kitt Peak || Spacewatch || HOF || align=right | 2.6 km || 
|-id=036 bgcolor=#d6d6d6
| 443036 ||  || — || February 14, 2013 || Kitt Peak || Spacewatch || — || align=right | 3.2 km || 
|-id=037 bgcolor=#E9E9E9
| 443037 ||  || — || October 5, 2003 || Kitt Peak || Spacewatch || KON || align=right | 2.1 km || 
|-id=038 bgcolor=#d6d6d6
| 443038 ||  || — || February 16, 2007 || Mount Lemmon || Mount Lemmon Survey || — || align=right | 2.9 km || 
|-id=039 bgcolor=#E9E9E9
| 443039 ||  || — || March 15, 2004 || Kitt Peak || Spacewatch || — || align=right | 2.1 km || 
|-id=040 bgcolor=#d6d6d6
| 443040 ||  || — || February 9, 2007 || Catalina || CSS || — || align=right | 4.5 km || 
|-id=041 bgcolor=#E9E9E9
| 443041 ||  || — || February 7, 2013 || Catalina || CSS || — || align=right | 2.6 km || 
|-id=042 bgcolor=#E9E9E9
| 443042 ||  || — || October 21, 2006 || Kitt Peak || Spacewatch || — || align=right | 2.2 km || 
|-id=043 bgcolor=#d6d6d6
| 443043 ||  || — || September 18, 2010 || Mount Lemmon || Mount Lemmon Survey || EOS || align=right | 2.3 km || 
|-id=044 bgcolor=#E9E9E9
| 443044 ||  || — || December 17, 2003 || Kitt Peak || Spacewatch || — || align=right | 1.3 km || 
|-id=045 bgcolor=#d6d6d6
| 443045 ||  || — || October 11, 2004 || Kitt Peak || Spacewatch || — || align=right | 3.5 km || 
|-id=046 bgcolor=#d6d6d6
| 443046 ||  || — || March 8, 2005 || Anderson Mesa || LONEOS || 3:2 || align=right | 5.0 km || 
|-id=047 bgcolor=#d6d6d6
| 443047 ||  || — || December 25, 2006 || Kitt Peak || Spacewatch || — || align=right | 3.7 km || 
|-id=048 bgcolor=#d6d6d6
| 443048 ||  || — || March 21, 2002 || Kitt Peak || Spacewatch || — || align=right | 3.4 km || 
|-id=049 bgcolor=#d6d6d6
| 443049 ||  || — || October 7, 2005 || Kitt Peak || Spacewatch || — || align=right | 2.8 km || 
|-id=050 bgcolor=#d6d6d6
| 443050 ||  || — || November 9, 2010 || Catalina || CSS || — || align=right | 3.6 km || 
|-id=051 bgcolor=#E9E9E9
| 443051 ||  || — || December 29, 2008 || Mount Lemmon || Mount Lemmon Survey || — || align=right | 1.1 km || 
|-id=052 bgcolor=#d6d6d6
| 443052 ||  || — || January 10, 2007 || Kitt Peak || Spacewatch || EMA || align=right | 4.3 km || 
|-id=053 bgcolor=#E9E9E9
| 443053 ||  || — || August 28, 2006 || Kitt Peak || Spacewatch || — || align=right | 2.0 km || 
|-id=054 bgcolor=#d6d6d6
| 443054 ||  || — || June 30, 2010 || WISE || WISE || — || align=right | 3.3 km || 
|-id=055 bgcolor=#E9E9E9
| 443055 ||  || — || October 24, 2011 || Mount Lemmon || Mount Lemmon Survey || — || align=right | 1.7 km || 
|-id=056 bgcolor=#d6d6d6
| 443056 ||  || — || July 14, 2010 || WISE || WISE || — || align=right | 4.0 km || 
|-id=057 bgcolor=#d6d6d6
| 443057 ||  || — || January 2, 2006 || Mount Lemmon || Mount Lemmon Survey || — || align=right | 4.0 km || 
|-id=058 bgcolor=#d6d6d6
| 443058 ||  || — || January 27, 2007 || Kitt Peak || Spacewatch || — || align=right | 3.1 km || 
|-id=059 bgcolor=#d6d6d6
| 443059 ||  || — || January 27, 2007 || Mount Lemmon || Mount Lemmon Survey || — || align=right | 3.5 km || 
|-id=060 bgcolor=#d6d6d6
| 443060 ||  || — || October 1, 2005 || Mount Lemmon || Mount Lemmon Survey || — || align=right | 2.9 km || 
|-id=061 bgcolor=#d6d6d6
| 443061 ||  || — || November 1, 2005 || Mount Lemmon || Mount Lemmon Survey || — || align=right | 3.2 km || 
|-id=062 bgcolor=#d6d6d6
| 443062 ||  || — || October 4, 2004 || Kitt Peak || Spacewatch || — || align=right | 3.9 km || 
|-id=063 bgcolor=#d6d6d6
| 443063 ||  || — || September 16, 2010 || Kitt Peak || Spacewatch || — || align=right | 3.4 km || 
|-id=064 bgcolor=#E9E9E9
| 443064 ||  || — || February 29, 2004 || Kitt Peak || Spacewatch || — || align=right | 1.8 km || 
|-id=065 bgcolor=#d6d6d6
| 443065 ||  || — || February 14, 2013 || Catalina || CSS || EOS || align=right | 2.3 km || 
|-id=066 bgcolor=#E9E9E9
| 443066 ||  || — || February 3, 2000 || Kitt Peak || Spacewatch || MAR || align=right | 1.1 km || 
|-id=067 bgcolor=#E9E9E9
| 443067 ||  || — || March 18, 2004 || Socorro || LINEAR || — || align=right | 2.3 km || 
|-id=068 bgcolor=#E9E9E9
| 443068 ||  || — || March 29, 2004 || Kitt Peak || Spacewatch || — || align=right | 2.5 km || 
|-id=069 bgcolor=#E9E9E9
| 443069 ||  || — || July 3, 2005 || Mount Lemmon || Mount Lemmon Survey || — || align=right | 2.5 km || 
|-id=070 bgcolor=#d6d6d6
| 443070 ||  || — || September 7, 2000 || Kitt Peak || Spacewatch || EOS || align=right | 1.7 km || 
|-id=071 bgcolor=#d6d6d6
| 443071 ||  || — || March 30, 2008 || Catalina || CSS || EMA || align=right | 3.8 km || 
|-id=072 bgcolor=#d6d6d6
| 443072 ||  || — || August 30, 2005 || Kitt Peak || Spacewatch || — || align=right | 2.5 km || 
|-id=073 bgcolor=#d6d6d6
| 443073 ||  || — || March 13, 2007 || Mount Lemmon || Mount Lemmon Survey || ELF || align=right | 3.8 km || 
|-id=074 bgcolor=#d6d6d6
| 443074 ||  || — || November 6, 2005 || Kitt Peak || Spacewatch || — || align=right | 5.2 km || 
|-id=075 bgcolor=#d6d6d6
| 443075 ||  || — || December 18, 2000 || Kitt Peak || Spacewatch || — || align=right | 3.3 km || 
|-id=076 bgcolor=#d6d6d6
| 443076 ||  || — || April 7, 2008 || Kitt Peak || Spacewatch || EOS || align=right | 2.1 km || 
|-id=077 bgcolor=#d6d6d6
| 443077 ||  || — || January 10, 2007 || Kitt Peak || Spacewatch || EOS || align=right | 2.2 km || 
|-id=078 bgcolor=#d6d6d6
| 443078 ||  || — || September 16, 2009 || Catalina || CSS || — || align=right | 4.3 km || 
|-id=079 bgcolor=#d6d6d6
| 443079 ||  || — || October 6, 1999 || Kitt Peak || Spacewatch || EOS || align=right | 2.4 km || 
|-id=080 bgcolor=#d6d6d6
| 443080 ||  || — || February 23, 2007 || Kitt Peak || Spacewatch || HYG || align=right | 2.5 km || 
|-id=081 bgcolor=#d6d6d6
| 443081 ||  || — || February 17, 2007 || Kitt Peak || Spacewatch || — || align=right | 4.0 km || 
|-id=082 bgcolor=#d6d6d6
| 443082 ||  || — || October 1, 2010 || Kitt Peak || Spacewatch || — || align=right | 4.0 km || 
|-id=083 bgcolor=#d6d6d6
| 443083 ||  || — || April 28, 2008 || Catalina || CSS || — || align=right | 4.9 km || 
|-id=084 bgcolor=#d6d6d6
| 443084 ||  || — || January 28, 2007 || Mount Lemmon || Mount Lemmon Survey || LIX || align=right | 4.3 km || 
|-id=085 bgcolor=#d6d6d6
| 443085 ||  || — || February 21, 2007 || Mount Lemmon || Mount Lemmon Survey || — || align=right | 3.3 km || 
|-id=086 bgcolor=#d6d6d6
| 443086 ||  || — || September 23, 2008 || Kitt Peak || Spacewatch || 3:2 || align=right | 4.4 km || 
|-id=087 bgcolor=#d6d6d6
| 443087 ||  || — || September 10, 2004 || Kitt Peak || Spacewatch || — || align=right | 3.1 km || 
|-id=088 bgcolor=#d6d6d6
| 443088 ||  || — || August 30, 2005 || Kitt Peak || Spacewatch || KOR || align=right | 1.4 km || 
|-id=089 bgcolor=#E9E9E9
| 443089 ||  || — || December 29, 2008 || Mount Lemmon || Mount Lemmon Survey || — || align=right | 1.4 km || 
|-id=090 bgcolor=#d6d6d6
| 443090 ||  || — || January 17, 2007 || Kitt Peak || Spacewatch || — || align=right | 3.0 km || 
|-id=091 bgcolor=#d6d6d6
| 443091 ||  || — || November 21, 2001 || Kitt Peak || Spacewatch || — || align=right | 2.7 km || 
|-id=092 bgcolor=#E9E9E9
| 443092 ||  || — || March 18, 2009 || Catalina || CSS || — || align=right | 1.8 km || 
|-id=093 bgcolor=#d6d6d6
| 443093 ||  || — || January 25, 2007 || Catalina || CSS || — || align=right | 3.2 km || 
|-id=094 bgcolor=#d6d6d6
| 443094 ||  || — || March 10, 1995 || Kitt Peak || Spacewatch || — || align=right | 4.3 km || 
|-id=095 bgcolor=#d6d6d6
| 443095 ||  || — || November 15, 2001 || Socorro || LINEAR || — || align=right | 3.6 km || 
|-id=096 bgcolor=#d6d6d6
| 443096 ||  || — || January 19, 2012 || Kitt Peak || Spacewatch || — || align=right | 2.6 km || 
|-id=097 bgcolor=#d6d6d6
| 443097 ||  || — || December 28, 2005 || Kitt Peak || Spacewatch || — || align=right | 2.5 km || 
|-id=098 bgcolor=#d6d6d6
| 443098 ||  || — || October 19, 2010 || Mount Lemmon || Mount Lemmon Survey || THM || align=right | 1.8 km || 
|-id=099 bgcolor=#d6d6d6
| 443099 ||  || — || November 11, 2010 || Kitt Peak || Spacewatch || 7:4 || align=right | 3.4 km || 
|-id=100 bgcolor=#d6d6d6
| 443100 ||  || — || November 23, 2011 || Kitt Peak || Spacewatch || — || align=right | 2.9 km || 
|}

443101–443200 

|-bgcolor=#d6d6d6
| 443101 ||  || — || November 1, 2005 || Mount Lemmon || Mount Lemmon Survey || — || align=right | 4.0 km || 
|-id=102 bgcolor=#fefefe
| 443102 ||  || — || December 7, 1999 || Kitt Peak || Spacewatch || H || align=right data-sort-value="0.73" | 730 m || 
|-id=103 bgcolor=#FFC2E0
| 443103 ||  || — || November 29, 2013 || Kitt Peak || Spacewatch || APO +1kmPHAslowcritical || align=right data-sort-value="0.90" | 900 m || 
|-id=104 bgcolor=#FFC2E0
| 443104 ||  || — || December 14, 2013 || Catalina || CSS || APOcritical || align=right data-sort-value="0.049" | 49 m || 
|-id=105 bgcolor=#fefefe
| 443105 ||  || — || December 1, 2006 || Mount Lemmon || Mount Lemmon Survey || V || align=right data-sort-value="0.67" | 670 m || 
|-id=106 bgcolor=#fefefe
| 443106 ||  || — || December 27, 2006 || Mount Lemmon || Mount Lemmon Survey || — || align=right data-sort-value="0.80" | 800 m || 
|-id=107 bgcolor=#fefefe
| 443107 ||  || — || November 25, 2009 || Kitt Peak || Spacewatch || V || align=right data-sort-value="0.79" | 790 m || 
|-id=108 bgcolor=#fefefe
| 443108 ||  || — || April 21, 2004 || Kitt Peak || Spacewatch || — || align=right data-sort-value="0.92" | 920 m || 
|-id=109 bgcolor=#fefefe
| 443109 ||  || — || January 13, 1999 || Kitt Peak || Spacewatch || — || align=right | 1.0 km || 
|-id=110 bgcolor=#E9E9E9
| 443110 ||  || — || December 17, 2009 || Mount Lemmon || Mount Lemmon Survey || — || align=right | 1.3 km || 
|-id=111 bgcolor=#E9E9E9
| 443111 ||  || — || December 25, 2013 || Mount Lemmon || Mount Lemmon Survey || — || align=right | 1.6 km || 
|-id=112 bgcolor=#fefefe
| 443112 ||  || — || January 19, 2004 || Kitt Peak || Spacewatch || H || align=right data-sort-value="0.62" | 620 m || 
|-id=113 bgcolor=#fefefe
| 443113 ||  || — || February 4, 2000 || Kitt Peak || Spacewatch || — || align=right data-sort-value="0.67" | 670 m || 
|-id=114 bgcolor=#fefefe
| 443114 ||  || — || March 27, 2004 || Socorro || LINEAR || — || align=right data-sort-value="0.66" | 660 m || 
|-id=115 bgcolor=#E9E9E9
| 443115 ||  || — || May 31, 2006 || Kitt Peak || Spacewatch || — || align=right | 2.4 km || 
|-id=116 bgcolor=#fefefe
| 443116 ||  || — || April 2, 2011 || Mount Lemmon || Mount Lemmon Survey || — || align=right data-sort-value="0.66" | 660 m || 
|-id=117 bgcolor=#fefefe
| 443117 ||  || — || January 3, 2014 || Kitt Peak || Spacewatch || — || align=right data-sort-value="0.56" | 560 m || 
|-id=118 bgcolor=#E9E9E9
| 443118 ||  || — || January 4, 2014 || Mount Lemmon || Mount Lemmon Survey || — || align=right | 2.0 km || 
|-id=119 bgcolor=#fefefe
| 443119 ||  || — || December 6, 2005 || Catalina || CSS || H || align=right data-sort-value="0.87" | 870 m || 
|-id=120 bgcolor=#fefefe
| 443120 ||  || — || February 7, 2006 || Mount Lemmon || Mount Lemmon Survey || H || align=right data-sort-value="0.66" | 660 m || 
|-id=121 bgcolor=#fefefe
| 443121 ||  || — || February 2, 2000 || Socorro || LINEAR || H || align=right data-sort-value="0.96" | 960 m || 
|-id=122 bgcolor=#fefefe
| 443122 ||  || — || September 29, 2009 || Mount Lemmon || Mount Lemmon Survey || — || align=right data-sort-value="0.74" | 740 m || 
|-id=123 bgcolor=#fefefe
| 443123 ||  || — || January 31, 2006 || Catalina || CSS || H || align=right data-sort-value="0.67" | 670 m || 
|-id=124 bgcolor=#fefefe
| 443124 ||  || — || October 28, 2005 || Mount Lemmon || Mount Lemmon Survey || — || align=right data-sort-value="0.97" | 970 m || 
|-id=125 bgcolor=#fefefe
| 443125 ||  || — || January 18, 2009 || Mount Lemmon || Mount Lemmon Survey || H || align=right data-sort-value="0.83" | 830 m || 
|-id=126 bgcolor=#fefefe
| 443126 ||  || — || December 12, 2010 || Mount Lemmon || Mount Lemmon Survey || — || align=right data-sort-value="0.86" | 860 m || 
|-id=127 bgcolor=#fefefe
| 443127 ||  || — || November 21, 2000 || Socorro || LINEAR || H || align=right data-sort-value="0.73" | 730 m || 
|-id=128 bgcolor=#fefefe
| 443128 ||  || — || January 2, 2009 || Kitt Peak || Spacewatch || H || align=right data-sort-value="0.59" | 590 m || 
|-id=129 bgcolor=#fefefe
| 443129 ||  || — || February 3, 2009 || Mount Lemmon || Mount Lemmon Survey || H || align=right data-sort-value="0.65" | 650 m || 
|-id=130 bgcolor=#fefefe
| 443130 ||  || — || February 3, 2006 || Catalina || CSS || H || align=right data-sort-value="0.62" | 620 m || 
|-id=131 bgcolor=#fefefe
| 443131 ||  || — || July 14, 2004 || Siding Spring || SSS || H || align=right data-sort-value="0.57" | 570 m || 
|-id=132 bgcolor=#E9E9E9
| 443132 ||  || — || February 15, 2010 || Mount Lemmon || Mount Lemmon Survey || — || align=right | 1.4 km || 
|-id=133 bgcolor=#fefefe
| 443133 ||  || — || February 23, 2003 || Campo Imperatore || CINEOS || — || align=right data-sort-value="0.92" | 920 m || 
|-id=134 bgcolor=#fefefe
| 443134 ||  || — || November 21, 2006 || Mount Lemmon || Mount Lemmon Survey || — || align=right data-sort-value="0.91" | 910 m || 
|-id=135 bgcolor=#E9E9E9
| 443135 ||  || — || December 25, 2013 || Mount Lemmon || Mount Lemmon Survey || — || align=right | 1.7 km || 
|-id=136 bgcolor=#E9E9E9
| 443136 ||  || — || January 9, 2014 || Mount Lemmon || Mount Lemmon Survey || — || align=right | 2.3 km || 
|-id=137 bgcolor=#fefefe
| 443137 ||  || — || February 7, 2007 || Mount Lemmon || Mount Lemmon Survey || — || align=right data-sort-value="0.74" | 740 m || 
|-id=138 bgcolor=#fefefe
| 443138 ||  || — || February 1, 2006 || Catalina || CSS || H || align=right data-sort-value="0.76" | 760 m || 
|-id=139 bgcolor=#fefefe
| 443139 ||  || — || February 8, 2011 || Mount Lemmon || Mount Lemmon Survey || — || align=right data-sort-value="0.64" | 640 m || 
|-id=140 bgcolor=#fefefe
| 443140 ||  || — || March 25, 2011 || Kitt Peak || Spacewatch || — || align=right data-sort-value="0.69" | 690 m || 
|-id=141 bgcolor=#fefefe
| 443141 ||  || — || January 31, 2003 || Socorro || LINEAR || H || align=right data-sort-value="0.67" | 670 m || 
|-id=142 bgcolor=#fefefe
| 443142 ||  || — || May 21, 2004 || Kitt Peak || Spacewatch || — || align=right data-sort-value="0.65" | 650 m || 
|-id=143 bgcolor=#fefefe
| 443143 ||  || — || April 24, 2003 || Campo Imperatore || CINEOS || — || align=right data-sort-value="0.90" | 900 m || 
|-id=144 bgcolor=#E9E9E9
| 443144 ||  || — || November 18, 2003 || Kitt Peak || Spacewatch || WIT || align=right | 1.2 km || 
|-id=145 bgcolor=#fefefe
| 443145 ||  || — || October 28, 2005 || Mount Lemmon || Mount Lemmon Survey || — || align=right data-sort-value="0.81" | 810 m || 
|-id=146 bgcolor=#fefefe
| 443146 ||  || — || January 6, 2010 || Kitt Peak || Spacewatch || NYS || align=right data-sort-value="0.61" | 610 m || 
|-id=147 bgcolor=#fefefe
| 443147 ||  || — || April 16, 2004 || Kitt Peak || Spacewatch || — || align=right data-sort-value="0.81" | 810 m || 
|-id=148 bgcolor=#fefefe
| 443148 ||  || — || March 16, 1994 || Kitt Peak || Spacewatch || — || align=right data-sort-value="0.75" | 750 m || 
|-id=149 bgcolor=#fefefe
| 443149 ||  || — || February 19, 2009 || Kitt Peak || Spacewatch || H || align=right data-sort-value="0.74" | 740 m || 
|-id=150 bgcolor=#E9E9E9
| 443150 ||  || — || January 29, 2009 || Catalina || CSS || — || align=right | 3.5 km || 
|-id=151 bgcolor=#E9E9E9
| 443151 ||  || — || December 2, 2008 || Kitt Peak || Spacewatch || — || align=right | 2.6 km || 
|-id=152 bgcolor=#fefefe
| 443152 ||  || — || March 11, 2007 || Kitt Peak || Spacewatch || NYS || align=right data-sort-value="0.59" | 590 m || 
|-id=153 bgcolor=#E9E9E9
| 443153 ||  || — || May 1, 2006 || Catalina || CSS || — || align=right | 1.7 km || 
|-id=154 bgcolor=#fefefe
| 443154 ||  || — || February 23, 2007 || Kitt Peak || Spacewatch || — || align=right data-sort-value="0.74" | 740 m || 
|-id=155 bgcolor=#E9E9E9
| 443155 ||  || — || August 22, 1998 || Xinglong || SCAP || — || align=right | 2.0 km || 
|-id=156 bgcolor=#fefefe
| 443156 ||  || — || September 1, 2005 || Kitt Peak || Spacewatch || — || align=right data-sort-value="0.70" | 700 m || 
|-id=157 bgcolor=#E9E9E9
| 443157 ||  || — || January 23, 2006 || Kitt Peak || Spacewatch || — || align=right data-sort-value="0.89" | 890 m || 
|-id=158 bgcolor=#FA8072
| 443158 ||  || — || February 26, 2000 || Catalina || CSS || — || align=right data-sort-value="0.68" | 680 m || 
|-id=159 bgcolor=#fefefe
| 443159 ||  || — || December 29, 2005 || Kitt Peak || Spacewatch || NYS || align=right data-sort-value="0.76" | 760 m || 
|-id=160 bgcolor=#fefefe
| 443160 ||  || — || January 27, 2007 || Kitt Peak || Spacewatch || V || align=right data-sort-value="0.53" | 530 m || 
|-id=161 bgcolor=#fefefe
| 443161 ||  || — || March 14, 2007 || Kitt Peak || Spacewatch || NYS || align=right data-sort-value="0.68" | 680 m || 
|-id=162 bgcolor=#E9E9E9
| 443162 ||  || — || June 14, 2007 || Kitt Peak || Spacewatch || — || align=right | 2.7 km || 
|-id=163 bgcolor=#fefefe
| 443163 ||  || — || November 4, 2012 || Mount Lemmon || Mount Lemmon Survey || — || align=right data-sort-value="0.84" | 840 m || 
|-id=164 bgcolor=#fefefe
| 443164 ||  || — || December 21, 2005 || Socorro || LINEAR || H || align=right data-sort-value="0.74" | 740 m || 
|-id=165 bgcolor=#fefefe
| 443165 ||  || — || April 26, 2007 || Mount Lemmon || Mount Lemmon Survey || — || align=right data-sort-value="0.96" | 960 m || 
|-id=166 bgcolor=#fefefe
| 443166 ||  || — || January 12, 2010 || Catalina || CSS || — || align=right | 1.2 km || 
|-id=167 bgcolor=#fefefe
| 443167 ||  || — || February 6, 2007 || Kitt Peak || Spacewatch || — || align=right data-sort-value="0.71" | 710 m || 
|-id=168 bgcolor=#fefefe
| 443168 ||  || — || February 16, 2010 || Mount Lemmon || Mount Lemmon Survey || — || align=right | 1.2 km || 
|-id=169 bgcolor=#fefefe
| 443169 ||  || — || March 15, 2007 || Mount Lemmon || Mount Lemmon Survey || — || align=right data-sort-value="0.81" | 810 m || 
|-id=170 bgcolor=#fefefe
| 443170 ||  || — || November 29, 2005 || Kitt Peak || Spacewatch || MAS || align=right data-sort-value="0.77" | 770 m || 
|-id=171 bgcolor=#E9E9E9
| 443171 ||  || — || February 16, 2010 || Mount Lemmon || Mount Lemmon Survey || — || align=right | 1.4 km || 
|-id=172 bgcolor=#fefefe
| 443172 ||  || — || October 22, 2009 || Mount Lemmon || Mount Lemmon Survey || — || align=right data-sort-value="0.70" | 700 m || 
|-id=173 bgcolor=#fefefe
| 443173 ||  || — || January 28, 2006 || Mount Lemmon || Mount Lemmon Survey || — || align=right | 1.2 km || 
|-id=174 bgcolor=#fefefe
| 443174 ||  || — || October 6, 2008 || Mount Lemmon || Mount Lemmon Survey || NYS || align=right data-sort-value="0.83" | 830 m || 
|-id=175 bgcolor=#E9E9E9
| 443175 ||  || — || March 5, 2006 || Kitt Peak || Spacewatch || — || align=right | 1.1 km || 
|-id=176 bgcolor=#fefefe
| 443176 ||  || — || November 10, 2005 || Mount Lemmon || Mount Lemmon Survey || — || align=right data-sort-value="0.94" | 940 m || 
|-id=177 bgcolor=#d6d6d6
| 443177 ||  || — || September 28, 2006 || Kitt Peak || Spacewatch || — || align=right | 2.4 km || 
|-id=178 bgcolor=#E9E9E9
| 443178 ||  || — || March 26, 2006 || Kitt Peak || Spacewatch || — || align=right | 1.1 km || 
|-id=179 bgcolor=#E9E9E9
| 443179 ||  || — || February 14, 2010 || Kitt Peak || Spacewatch || — || align=right data-sort-value="0.77" | 770 m || 
|-id=180 bgcolor=#fefefe
| 443180 ||  || — || November 25, 2009 || Kitt Peak || Spacewatch || — || align=right data-sort-value="0.68" | 680 m || 
|-id=181 bgcolor=#fefefe
| 443181 ||  || — || December 6, 2005 || Kitt Peak || Spacewatch || — || align=right data-sort-value="0.74" | 740 m || 
|-id=182 bgcolor=#E9E9E9
| 443182 ||  || — || February 14, 2010 || Kitt Peak || Spacewatch || — || align=right data-sort-value="0.89" | 890 m || 
|-id=183 bgcolor=#d6d6d6
| 443183 ||  || — || January 16, 2009 || Mount Lemmon || Mount Lemmon Survey || — || align=right | 1.9 km || 
|-id=184 bgcolor=#fefefe
| 443184 ||  || — || January 28, 2007 || Mount Lemmon || Mount Lemmon Survey || — || align=right data-sort-value="0.72" | 720 m || 
|-id=185 bgcolor=#fefefe
| 443185 ||  || — || May 10, 2007 || Mount Lemmon || Mount Lemmon Survey || V || align=right data-sort-value="0.78" | 780 m || 
|-id=186 bgcolor=#fefefe
| 443186 ||  || — || April 2, 1995 || Kitt Peak || Spacewatch || NYS || align=right data-sort-value="0.83" | 830 m || 
|-id=187 bgcolor=#E9E9E9
| 443187 ||  || — || March 4, 1997 || Kitt Peak || Spacewatch || — || align=right | 1.4 km || 
|-id=188 bgcolor=#fefefe
| 443188 ||  || — || March 11, 2011 || Mount Lemmon || Mount Lemmon Survey || — || align=right data-sort-value="0.82" | 820 m || 
|-id=189 bgcolor=#E9E9E9
| 443189 ||  || — || June 25, 2011 || Kitt Peak || Spacewatch || — || align=right | 1.4 km || 
|-id=190 bgcolor=#fefefe
| 443190 ||  || — || April 6, 2011 || Mount Lemmon || Mount Lemmon Survey || — || align=right data-sort-value="0.75" | 750 m || 
|-id=191 bgcolor=#fefefe
| 443191 ||  || — || October 7, 2008 || Mount Lemmon || Mount Lemmon Survey || — || align=right data-sort-value="0.89" | 890 m || 
|-id=192 bgcolor=#fefefe
| 443192 ||  || — || December 19, 2009 || Mount Lemmon || Mount Lemmon Survey || — || align=right data-sort-value="0.87" | 870 m || 
|-id=193 bgcolor=#E9E9E9
| 443193 ||  || — || September 30, 1999 || Kitt Peak || Spacewatch || — || align=right | 1.1 km || 
|-id=194 bgcolor=#fefefe
| 443194 ||  || — || April 29, 2003 || Kitt Peak || Spacewatch || NYS || align=right | 1.0 km || 
|-id=195 bgcolor=#fefefe
| 443195 ||  || — || November 1, 2005 || Kitt Peak || Spacewatch || — || align=right data-sort-value="0.70" | 700 m || 
|-id=196 bgcolor=#fefefe
| 443196 ||  || — || November 5, 2005 || Kitt Peak || Spacewatch || — || align=right | 1.9 km || 
|-id=197 bgcolor=#fefefe
| 443197 ||  || — || October 27, 2008 || Mount Lemmon || Mount Lemmon Survey || — || align=right data-sort-value="0.94" | 940 m || 
|-id=198 bgcolor=#d6d6d6
| 443198 ||  || — || January 18, 2008 || Kitt Peak || Spacewatch || — || align=right | 2.7 km || 
|-id=199 bgcolor=#fefefe
| 443199 ||  || — || March 19, 2007 || Mount Lemmon || Mount Lemmon Survey || — || align=right data-sort-value="0.93" | 930 m || 
|-id=200 bgcolor=#fefefe
| 443200 ||  || — || March 14, 2007 || Mount Lemmon || Mount Lemmon Survey || — || align=right data-sort-value="0.74" | 740 m || 
|}

443201–443300 

|-bgcolor=#E9E9E9
| 443201 ||  || — || April 6, 2010 || Kitt Peak || Spacewatch || — || align=right | 1.2 km || 
|-id=202 bgcolor=#E9E9E9
| 443202 ||  || — || December 22, 2008 || Mount Lemmon || Mount Lemmon Survey || — || align=right | 1.00 km || 
|-id=203 bgcolor=#E9E9E9
| 443203 ||  || — || March 17, 2010 || Kitt Peak || Spacewatch || — || align=right | 1.6 km || 
|-id=204 bgcolor=#fefefe
| 443204 ||  || — || November 25, 2000 || Kitt Peak || Spacewatch || V || align=right data-sort-value="0.82" | 820 m || 
|-id=205 bgcolor=#fefefe
| 443205 ||  || — || November 4, 2005 || Mount Lemmon || Mount Lemmon Survey || — || align=right data-sort-value="0.64" | 640 m || 
|-id=206 bgcolor=#E9E9E9
| 443206 ||  || — || November 3, 2008 || Mount Lemmon || Mount Lemmon Survey || — || align=right data-sort-value="0.90" | 900 m || 
|-id=207 bgcolor=#fefefe
| 443207 ||  || — || December 27, 2006 || Mount Lemmon || Mount Lemmon Survey || — || align=right data-sort-value="0.78" | 780 m || 
|-id=208 bgcolor=#fefefe
| 443208 ||  || — || May 22, 2011 || Mount Lemmon || Mount Lemmon Survey || — || align=right data-sort-value="0.59" | 590 m || 
|-id=209 bgcolor=#fefefe
| 443209 ||  || — || February 4, 2000 || Kitt Peak || Spacewatch || — || align=right data-sort-value="0.73" | 730 m || 
|-id=210 bgcolor=#E9E9E9
| 443210 ||  || — || November 20, 2008 || Kitt Peak || Spacewatch || — || align=right | 1.2 km || 
|-id=211 bgcolor=#d6d6d6
| 443211 ||  || — || November 8, 2007 || Kitt Peak || Spacewatch || KOR || align=right | 1.5 km || 
|-id=212 bgcolor=#fefefe
| 443212 ||  || — || March 14, 2007 || Kitt Peak || Spacewatch || V || align=right data-sort-value="0.60" | 600 m || 
|-id=213 bgcolor=#fefefe
| 443213 ||  || — || March 2, 1995 || Kitt Peak || Spacewatch || NYS || align=right data-sort-value="0.87" | 870 m || 
|-id=214 bgcolor=#E9E9E9
| 443214 ||  || — || October 9, 1999 || Kitt Peak || Spacewatch || — || align=right data-sort-value="0.95" | 950 m || 
|-id=215 bgcolor=#E9E9E9
| 443215 ||  || — || January 8, 2009 || Kitt Peak || Spacewatch || — || align=right | 1.5 km || 
|-id=216 bgcolor=#fefefe
| 443216 ||  || — || September 18, 1999 || Kitt Peak || Spacewatch || — || align=right data-sort-value="0.60" | 600 m || 
|-id=217 bgcolor=#fefefe
| 443217 ||  || — || November 20, 2009 || Mount Lemmon || Mount Lemmon Survey || — || align=right data-sort-value="0.82" | 820 m || 
|-id=218 bgcolor=#fefefe
| 443218 ||  || — || February 26, 2007 || Mount Lemmon || Mount Lemmon Survey || NYS || align=right data-sort-value="0.72" | 720 m || 
|-id=219 bgcolor=#fefefe
| 443219 ||  || — || August 31, 2005 || Kitt Peak || Spacewatch || — || align=right data-sort-value="0.90" | 900 m || 
|-id=220 bgcolor=#E9E9E9
| 443220 ||  || — || October 24, 2003 || Socorro || LINEAR || — || align=right | 2.2 km || 
|-id=221 bgcolor=#fefefe
| 443221 ||  || — || January 28, 2014 || Kitt Peak || Spacewatch || — || align=right data-sort-value="0.74" | 740 m || 
|-id=222 bgcolor=#fefefe
| 443222 ||  || — || October 28, 2006 || Kitt Peak || Spacewatch || — || align=right data-sort-value="0.62" | 620 m || 
|-id=223 bgcolor=#E9E9E9
| 443223 ||  || — || October 8, 2007 || Mount Lemmon || Mount Lemmon Survey || KON || align=right | 2.2 km || 
|-id=224 bgcolor=#E9E9E9
| 443224 ||  || — || May 1, 2006 || Kitt Peak || Spacewatch || — || align=right | 1.5 km || 
|-id=225 bgcolor=#fefefe
| 443225 ||  || — || January 28, 2007 || Mount Lemmon || Mount Lemmon Survey || — || align=right data-sort-value="0.58" | 580 m || 
|-id=226 bgcolor=#fefefe
| 443226 ||  || — || January 10, 2010 || Kitt Peak || Spacewatch || MAS || align=right data-sort-value="0.65" | 650 m || 
|-id=227 bgcolor=#fefefe
| 443227 ||  || — || April 26, 2003 || Kitt Peak || Spacewatch || MAS || align=right data-sort-value="0.77" | 770 m || 
|-id=228 bgcolor=#E9E9E9
| 443228 ||  || — || May 7, 2010 || Kitt Peak || Spacewatch || — || align=right | 1.5 km || 
|-id=229 bgcolor=#fefefe
| 443229 ||  || — || March 27, 2011 || Kitt Peak || Spacewatch || — || align=right data-sort-value="0.60" | 600 m || 
|-id=230 bgcolor=#fefefe
| 443230 ||  || — || October 31, 2005 || Kitt Peak || Spacewatch || — || align=right data-sort-value="0.79" | 790 m || 
|-id=231 bgcolor=#fefefe
| 443231 ||  || — || March 13, 2010 || Kitt Peak || Spacewatch || — || align=right | 1.1 km || 
|-id=232 bgcolor=#E9E9E9
| 443232 ||  || — || April 6, 2010 || Catalina || CSS || — || align=right | 1.9 km || 
|-id=233 bgcolor=#fefefe
| 443233 ||  || — || January 23, 2014 || Mount Lemmon || Mount Lemmon Survey || — || align=right | 1.1 km || 
|-id=234 bgcolor=#E9E9E9
| 443234 ||  || — || March 25, 2010 || Kitt Peak || Spacewatch || — || align=right | 1.3 km || 
|-id=235 bgcolor=#E9E9E9
| 443235 ||  || — || April 21, 2006 || Kitt Peak || Spacewatch || — || align=right | 2.5 km || 
|-id=236 bgcolor=#fefefe
| 443236 ||  || — || November 26, 2009 || Kitt Peak || Spacewatch || — || align=right data-sort-value="0.93" | 930 m || 
|-id=237 bgcolor=#E9E9E9
| 443237 ||  || — || March 19, 2010 || Kitt Peak || Spacewatch || — || align=right | 1.2 km || 
|-id=238 bgcolor=#fefefe
| 443238 ||  || — || September 23, 2012 || Mount Lemmon || Mount Lemmon Survey || — || align=right data-sort-value="0.76" | 760 m || 
|-id=239 bgcolor=#fefefe
| 443239 ||  || — || April 11, 2007 || Mount Lemmon || Mount Lemmon Survey || MAS || align=right data-sort-value="0.63" | 630 m || 
|-id=240 bgcolor=#fefefe
| 443240 ||  || — || November 30, 2005 || Kitt Peak || Spacewatch || NYS || align=right data-sort-value="0.70" | 700 m || 
|-id=241 bgcolor=#fefefe
| 443241 ||  || — || April 19, 2007 || Mount Lemmon || Mount Lemmon Survey || MAS || align=right data-sort-value="0.72" | 720 m || 
|-id=242 bgcolor=#E9E9E9
| 443242 ||  || — || February 9, 2005 || Mount Lemmon || Mount Lemmon Survey || — || align=right | 1.7 km || 
|-id=243 bgcolor=#d6d6d6
| 443243 ||  || — || September 24, 2011 || Mount Lemmon || Mount Lemmon Survey || — || align=right | 2.3 km || 
|-id=244 bgcolor=#E9E9E9
| 443244 ||  || — || February 18, 2010 || Mount Lemmon || Mount Lemmon Survey || — || align=right data-sort-value="0.98" | 980 m || 
|-id=245 bgcolor=#E9E9E9
| 443245 ||  || — || January 2, 2009 || Mount Lemmon || Mount Lemmon Survey || AEO || align=right data-sort-value="0.98" | 980 m || 
|-id=246 bgcolor=#fefefe
| 443246 ||  || — || January 23, 2006 || Kitt Peak || Spacewatch || — || align=right | 1.2 km || 
|-id=247 bgcolor=#fefefe
| 443247 ||  || — || December 25, 2009 || Kitt Peak || Spacewatch || — || align=right data-sort-value="0.67" | 670 m || 
|-id=248 bgcolor=#fefefe
| 443248 ||  || — || February 23, 2007 || Catalina || CSS || — || align=right data-sort-value="0.86" | 860 m || 
|-id=249 bgcolor=#fefefe
| 443249 ||  || — || November 27, 2009 || Kitt Peak || Spacewatch || ERI || align=right | 2.3 km || 
|-id=250 bgcolor=#E9E9E9
| 443250 ||  || — || December 21, 2008 || Mount Lemmon || Mount Lemmon Survey || — || align=right | 2.6 km || 
|-id=251 bgcolor=#fefefe
| 443251 ||  || — || March 12, 2003 || Kitt Peak || Spacewatch || — || align=right data-sort-value="0.98" | 980 m || 
|-id=252 bgcolor=#fefefe
| 443252 ||  || — || August 21, 2008 || Kitt Peak || Spacewatch || — || align=right data-sort-value="0.84" | 840 m || 
|-id=253 bgcolor=#fefefe
| 443253 ||  || — || April 14, 2007 || Kitt Peak || Spacewatch || NYS || align=right data-sort-value="0.55" | 550 m || 
|-id=254 bgcolor=#fefefe
| 443254 ||  || — || January 4, 2001 || Kitt Peak || Spacewatch || — || align=right data-sort-value="0.52" | 520 m || 
|-id=255 bgcolor=#E9E9E9
| 443255 ||  || — || March 13, 2010 || Kitt Peak || Spacewatch || — || align=right | 1.1 km || 
|-id=256 bgcolor=#E9E9E9
| 443256 ||  || — || March 20, 2010 || Kitt Peak || Spacewatch || — || align=right data-sort-value="0.89" | 890 m || 
|-id=257 bgcolor=#fefefe
| 443257 ||  || — || April 8, 2003 || Kitt Peak || Spacewatch || MAS || align=right data-sort-value="0.80" | 800 m || 
|-id=258 bgcolor=#fefefe
| 443258 ||  || — || October 1, 2009 || Mount Lemmon || Mount Lemmon Survey || — || align=right data-sort-value="0.72" | 720 m || 
|-id=259 bgcolor=#fefefe
| 443259 ||  || — || December 10, 2004 || Campo Imperatore || CINEOS || — || align=right | 1.1 km || 
|-id=260 bgcolor=#fefefe
| 443260 ||  || — || December 16, 2009 || Kitt Peak || Spacewatch || — || align=right data-sort-value="0.99" | 990 m || 
|-id=261 bgcolor=#fefefe
| 443261 ||  || — || January 30, 2006 || Kitt Peak || Spacewatch || — || align=right data-sort-value="0.88" | 880 m || 
|-id=262 bgcolor=#fefefe
| 443262 ||  || — || September 12, 1998 || Kitt Peak || Spacewatch || — || align=right data-sort-value="0.94" | 940 m || 
|-id=263 bgcolor=#E9E9E9
| 443263 ||  || — || February 13, 2010 || Mount Lemmon || Mount Lemmon Survey || — || align=right data-sort-value="0.80" | 800 m || 
|-id=264 bgcolor=#d6d6d6
| 443264 ||  || — || November 5, 2007 || Kitt Peak || Spacewatch || KOR || align=right | 1.4 km || 
|-id=265 bgcolor=#fefefe
| 443265 ||  || — || April 14, 2007 || Kitt Peak || Spacewatch || — || align=right data-sort-value="0.81" | 810 m || 
|-id=266 bgcolor=#E9E9E9
| 443266 ||  || — || February 8, 2010 || WISE || WISE || — || align=right | 2.0 km || 
|-id=267 bgcolor=#fefefe
| 443267 ||  || — || January 19, 2004 || Kitt Peak || Spacewatch || — || align=right data-sort-value="0.75" | 750 m || 
|-id=268 bgcolor=#fefefe
| 443268 ||  || — || March 26, 2007 || Kitt Peak || Spacewatch || — || align=right data-sort-value="0.67" | 670 m || 
|-id=269 bgcolor=#E9E9E9
| 443269 ||  || — || June 22, 2007 || Kitt Peak || Spacewatch || fast? || align=right | 1.1 km || 
|-id=270 bgcolor=#E9E9E9
| 443270 ||  || — || March 9, 2005 || Kitt Peak || Spacewatch || — || align=right | 2.1 km || 
|-id=271 bgcolor=#d6d6d6
| 443271 ||  || — || October 20, 1995 || Kitt Peak || Spacewatch || — || align=right | 2.8 km || 
|-id=272 bgcolor=#E9E9E9
| 443272 ||  || — || February 27, 2006 || Kitt Peak || Spacewatch || — || align=right data-sort-value="0.90" | 900 m || 
|-id=273 bgcolor=#d6d6d6
| 443273 ||  || — || January 10, 2008 || Mount Lemmon || Mount Lemmon Survey || — || align=right | 2.0 km || 
|-id=274 bgcolor=#fefefe
| 443274 ||  || — || February 14, 2010 || Mount Lemmon || Mount Lemmon Survey || — || align=right data-sort-value="0.82" | 820 m || 
|-id=275 bgcolor=#d6d6d6
| 443275 ||  || — || March 7, 2008 || Mount Lemmon || Mount Lemmon Survey || — || align=right | 2.9 km || 
|-id=276 bgcolor=#E9E9E9
| 443276 ||  || — || December 31, 2013 || Mount Lemmon || Mount Lemmon Survey || EUN || align=right | 1.3 km || 
|-id=277 bgcolor=#E9E9E9
| 443277 ||  || — || December 5, 2008 || Kitt Peak || Spacewatch || — || align=right | 1.4 km || 
|-id=278 bgcolor=#E9E9E9
| 443278 ||  || — || March 24, 2006 || Kitt Peak || Spacewatch || — || align=right data-sort-value="0.98" | 980 m || 
|-id=279 bgcolor=#fefefe
| 443279 ||  || — || November 17, 2009 || Mount Lemmon || Mount Lemmon Survey || — || align=right data-sort-value="0.83" | 830 m || 
|-id=280 bgcolor=#fefefe
| 443280 ||  || — || December 5, 2005 || Kitt Peak || Spacewatch || — || align=right data-sort-value="0.91" | 910 m || 
|-id=281 bgcolor=#fefefe
| 443281 ||  || — || January 21, 2006 || Mount Lemmon || Mount Lemmon Survey || — || align=right data-sort-value="0.77" | 770 m || 
|-id=282 bgcolor=#fefefe
| 443282 ||  || — || October 17, 2012 || Mount Lemmon || Mount Lemmon Survey || — || align=right data-sort-value="0.86" | 860 m || 
|-id=283 bgcolor=#E9E9E9
| 443283 ||  || — || September 21, 2011 || Kitt Peak || Spacewatch || JUN || align=right | 1.3 km || 
|-id=284 bgcolor=#E9E9E9
| 443284 ||  || — || March 20, 2010 || Mount Lemmon || Mount Lemmon Survey || — || align=right | 3.6 km || 
|-id=285 bgcolor=#fefefe
| 443285 ||  || — || May 24, 2011 || Mount Lemmon || Mount Lemmon Survey || V || align=right data-sort-value="0.65" | 650 m || 
|-id=286 bgcolor=#E9E9E9
| 443286 ||  || — || March 25, 2006 || Kitt Peak || Spacewatch || — || align=right data-sort-value="0.99" | 990 m || 
|-id=287 bgcolor=#fefefe
| 443287 ||  || — || February 27, 2006 || Kitt Peak || Spacewatch || H || align=right data-sort-value="0.71" | 710 m || 
|-id=288 bgcolor=#E9E9E9
| 443288 ||  || — || December 30, 2008 || Mount Lemmon || Mount Lemmon Survey || — || align=right | 2.0 km || 
|-id=289 bgcolor=#E9E9E9
| 443289 ||  || — || September 14, 2007 || Catalina || CSS || BRG || align=right | 1.8 km || 
|-id=290 bgcolor=#d6d6d6
| 443290 ||  || — || December 11, 2001 || Socorro || LINEAR || EMA || align=right | 3.8 km || 
|-id=291 bgcolor=#E9E9E9
| 443291 ||  || — || October 9, 2007 || Mount Lemmon || Mount Lemmon Survey || — || align=right | 1.5 km || 
|-id=292 bgcolor=#E9E9E9
| 443292 ||  || — || March 9, 2005 || Mount Lemmon || Mount Lemmon Survey || critical || align=right | 1.9 km || 
|-id=293 bgcolor=#d6d6d6
| 443293 ||  || — || November 22, 2006 || Mount Lemmon || Mount Lemmon Survey || — || align=right | 2.9 km || 
|-id=294 bgcolor=#fefefe
| 443294 ||  || — || November 13, 2012 || Mount Lemmon || Mount Lemmon Survey || V || align=right data-sort-value="0.57" | 570 m || 
|-id=295 bgcolor=#d6d6d6
| 443295 ||  || — || May 9, 2005 || Kitt Peak || Spacewatch || — || align=right | 2.7 km || 
|-id=296 bgcolor=#E9E9E9
| 443296 ||  || — || May 18, 2002 || Kitt Peak || Spacewatch || — || align=right | 1.2 km || 
|-id=297 bgcolor=#E9E9E9
| 443297 ||  || — || May 23, 2006 || Mount Lemmon || Mount Lemmon Survey || — || align=right | 1.7 km || 
|-id=298 bgcolor=#fefefe
| 443298 ||  || — || September 5, 2008 || Kitt Peak || Spacewatch || — || align=right data-sort-value="0.75" | 750 m || 
|-id=299 bgcolor=#E9E9E9
| 443299 ||  || — || September 20, 2003 || Kitt Peak || Spacewatch || — || align=right | 1.8 km || 
|-id=300 bgcolor=#E9E9E9
| 443300 ||  || — || April 8, 2010 || Catalina || CSS || — || align=right | 2.0 km || 
|}

443301–443400 

|-bgcolor=#E9E9E9
| 443301 ||  || — || April 2, 2005 || Kitt Peak || Spacewatch || — || align=right | 2.2 km || 
|-id=302 bgcolor=#E9E9E9
| 443302 ||  || — || March 24, 2006 || Mount Lemmon || Mount Lemmon Survey || — || align=right data-sort-value="0.78" | 780 m || 
|-id=303 bgcolor=#E9E9E9
| 443303 ||  || — || April 20, 2010 || Siding Spring || SSS || — || align=right | 3.7 km || 
|-id=304 bgcolor=#E9E9E9
| 443304 ||  || — || January 26, 2009 || Mount Lemmon || Mount Lemmon Survey || — || align=right | 2.0 km || 
|-id=305 bgcolor=#fefefe
| 443305 ||  || — || September 26, 1995 || Kitt Peak || Spacewatch || — || align=right data-sort-value="0.65" | 650 m || 
|-id=306 bgcolor=#E9E9E9
| 443306 ||  || — || January 18, 2009 || Kitt Peak || Spacewatch || MRX || align=right | 1.0 km || 
|-id=307 bgcolor=#d6d6d6
| 443307 ||  || — || September 26, 2006 || Mount Lemmon || Mount Lemmon Survey || THM || align=right | 2.6 km || 
|-id=308 bgcolor=#E9E9E9
| 443308 ||  || — || September 26, 2006 || Mount Lemmon || Mount Lemmon Survey || — || align=right | 2.9 km || 
|-id=309 bgcolor=#E9E9E9
| 443309 ||  || — || February 28, 2000 || Kitt Peak || Spacewatch || — || align=right | 2.5 km || 
|-id=310 bgcolor=#d6d6d6
| 443310 ||  || — || March 23, 2003 || Kitt Peak || Spacewatch || — || align=right | 4.3 km || 
|-id=311 bgcolor=#E9E9E9
| 443311 ||  || — || April 29, 1997 || Kitt Peak || Spacewatch || — || align=right | 1.3 km || 
|-id=312 bgcolor=#E9E9E9
| 443312 ||  || — || May 1, 2000 || Kitt Peak || Spacewatch || DOR || align=right | 2.5 km || 
|-id=313 bgcolor=#E9E9E9
| 443313 ||  || — || March 2, 2009 || Mount Lemmon || Mount Lemmon Survey || GEF || align=right | 1.5 km || 
|-id=314 bgcolor=#fefefe
| 443314 ||  || — || January 7, 2006 || Mount Lemmon || Mount Lemmon Survey || NYS || align=right data-sort-value="0.75" | 750 m || 
|-id=315 bgcolor=#fefefe
| 443315 ||  || — || February 16, 2010 || Mount Lemmon || Mount Lemmon Survey || — || align=right | 1.1 km || 
|-id=316 bgcolor=#E9E9E9
| 443316 ||  || — || March 15, 2010 || Kitt Peak || Spacewatch || — || align=right | 1.6 km || 
|-id=317 bgcolor=#fefefe
| 443317 ||  || — || April 8, 2003 || Kitt Peak || Spacewatch || NYS || align=right data-sort-value="0.59" | 590 m || 
|-id=318 bgcolor=#E9E9E9
| 443318 ||  || — || October 9, 2007 || Kitt Peak || Spacewatch || EUN || align=right | 1.4 km || 
|-id=319 bgcolor=#E9E9E9
| 443319 ||  || — || May 23, 2006 || Mount Lemmon || Mount Lemmon Survey || — || align=right | 1.2 km || 
|-id=320 bgcolor=#fefefe
| 443320 ||  || — || October 23, 2008 || Mount Lemmon || Mount Lemmon Survey || — || align=right | 1.2 km || 
|-id=321 bgcolor=#fefefe
| 443321 ||  || — || September 4, 2008 || Kitt Peak || Spacewatch || — || align=right data-sort-value="0.95" | 950 m || 
|-id=322 bgcolor=#fefefe
| 443322 ||  || — || November 30, 2005 || Mount Lemmon || Mount Lemmon Survey || V || align=right data-sort-value="0.82" | 820 m || 
|-id=323 bgcolor=#E9E9E9
| 443323 ||  || — || July 3, 2003 || Kitt Peak || Spacewatch || — || align=right | 4.0 km || 
|-id=324 bgcolor=#fefefe
| 443324 ||  || — || November 14, 1998 || Kitt Peak || Spacewatch || — || align=right data-sort-value="0.62" | 620 m || 
|-id=325 bgcolor=#E9E9E9
| 443325 ||  || — || January 1, 2009 || Kitt Peak || Spacewatch || — || align=right | 1.5 km || 
|-id=326 bgcolor=#E9E9E9
| 443326 ||  || — || October 12, 2007 || Mount Lemmon || Mount Lemmon Survey || — || align=right | 1.9 km || 
|-id=327 bgcolor=#fefefe
| 443327 ||  || — || December 3, 2008 || Mount Lemmon || Mount Lemmon Survey || — || align=right data-sort-value="0.98" | 980 m || 
|-id=328 bgcolor=#fefefe
| 443328 ||  || — || December 7, 2005 || Kitt Peak || Spacewatch || — || align=right data-sort-value="0.93" | 930 m || 
|-id=329 bgcolor=#fefefe
| 443329 ||  || — || January 28, 2007 || Mount Lemmon || Mount Lemmon Survey || — || align=right | 1.00 km || 
|-id=330 bgcolor=#d6d6d6
| 443330 ||  || — || July 7, 2010 || WISE || WISE || — || align=right | 3.0 km || 
|-id=331 bgcolor=#E9E9E9
| 443331 ||  || — || April 18, 2010 || Kitt Peak || Spacewatch || — || align=right | 1.2 km || 
|-id=332 bgcolor=#d6d6d6
| 443332 ||  || — || January 13, 2008 || Kitt Peak || Spacewatch || — || align=right | 2.8 km || 
|-id=333 bgcolor=#fefefe
| 443333 ||  || — || September 9, 2007 || Mount Lemmon || Mount Lemmon Survey || H || align=right data-sort-value="0.44" | 440 m || 
|-id=334 bgcolor=#E9E9E9
| 443334 ||  || — || September 14, 2007 || Mount Lemmon || Mount Lemmon Survey || — || align=right | 1.2 km || 
|-id=335 bgcolor=#E9E9E9
| 443335 ||  || — || November 19, 2008 || Kitt Peak || Spacewatch || — || align=right data-sort-value="0.79" | 790 m || 
|-id=336 bgcolor=#d6d6d6
| 443336 ||  || — || March 23, 2003 || Kitt Peak || Spacewatch || — || align=right | 4.3 km || 
|-id=337 bgcolor=#d6d6d6
| 443337 ||  || — || November 24, 2011 || Mount Lemmon || Mount Lemmon Survey || — || align=right | 3.3 km || 
|-id=338 bgcolor=#d6d6d6
| 443338 ||  || — || April 25, 2003 || Kitt Peak || Spacewatch || VER || align=right | 4.0 km || 
|-id=339 bgcolor=#fefefe
| 443339 ||  || — || March 14, 2007 || Mount Lemmon || Mount Lemmon Survey || V || align=right data-sort-value="0.56" | 560 m || 
|-id=340 bgcolor=#E9E9E9
| 443340 ||  || — || April 10, 2010 || Mount Lemmon || Mount Lemmon Survey || — || align=right | 1.6 km || 
|-id=341 bgcolor=#d6d6d6
| 443341 ||  || — || March 2, 2009 || Mount Lemmon || Mount Lemmon Survey || — || align=right | 3.4 km || 
|-id=342 bgcolor=#E9E9E9
| 443342 ||  || — || October 18, 2007 || Mount Lemmon || Mount Lemmon Survey || — || align=right | 1.3 km || 
|-id=343 bgcolor=#d6d6d6
| 443343 ||  || — || February 8, 2008 || Kitt Peak || Spacewatch || — || align=right | 2.2 km || 
|-id=344 bgcolor=#d6d6d6
| 443344 ||  || — || September 1, 2010 || Mount Lemmon || Mount Lemmon Survey || — || align=right | 2.0 km || 
|-id=345 bgcolor=#d6d6d6
| 443345 ||  || — || December 30, 2007 || Kitt Peak || Spacewatch || — || align=right | 2.5 km || 
|-id=346 bgcolor=#E9E9E9
| 443346 ||  || — || December 22, 2003 || Kitt Peak || Spacewatch || AGN || align=right | 1.3 km || 
|-id=347 bgcolor=#d6d6d6
| 443347 ||  || — || February 13, 2008 || Kitt Peak || Spacewatch || — || align=right | 3.5 km || 
|-id=348 bgcolor=#d6d6d6
| 443348 ||  || — || April 2, 2006 || Kitt Peak || Spacewatch || SHU3:2 || align=right | 5.6 km || 
|-id=349 bgcolor=#d6d6d6
| 443349 ||  || — || February 28, 2008 || Mount Lemmon || Mount Lemmon Survey || — || align=right | 2.4 km || 
|-id=350 bgcolor=#E9E9E9
| 443350 ||  || — || October 30, 2007 || Mount Lemmon || Mount Lemmon Survey || — || align=right | 1.4 km || 
|-id=351 bgcolor=#d6d6d6
| 443351 ||  || — || February 11, 2008 || Mount Lemmon || Mount Lemmon Survey || — || align=right | 2.7 km || 
|-id=352 bgcolor=#E9E9E9
| 443352 ||  || — || October 16, 2007 || Kitt Peak || Spacewatch || — || align=right | 1.8 km || 
|-id=353 bgcolor=#d6d6d6
| 443353 ||  || — || February 29, 2008 || Catalina || CSS || Tj (2.99) || align=right | 5.9 km || 
|-id=354 bgcolor=#d6d6d6
| 443354 ||  || — || July 27, 2004 || Siding Spring || SSS || — || align=right | 3.0 km || 
|-id=355 bgcolor=#d6d6d6
| 443355 ||  || — || May 15, 2009 || Kitt Peak || Spacewatch || EOS || align=right | 1.8 km || 
|-id=356 bgcolor=#E9E9E9
| 443356 ||  || — || November 13, 2007 || Kitt Peak || Spacewatch || — || align=right | 2.3 km || 
|-id=357 bgcolor=#fefefe
| 443357 ||  || — || November 18, 2008 || Kitt Peak || Spacewatch || — || align=right data-sort-value="0.87" | 870 m || 
|-id=358 bgcolor=#d6d6d6
| 443358 ||  || — || February 27, 2008 || Mount Lemmon || Mount Lemmon Survey || — || align=right | 2.8 km || 
|-id=359 bgcolor=#E9E9E9
| 443359 ||  || — || March 18, 2010 || Kitt Peak || Spacewatch || — || align=right data-sort-value="0.98" | 980 m || 
|-id=360 bgcolor=#d6d6d6
| 443360 ||  || — || March 13, 2008 || Kitt Peak || Spacewatch || — || align=right | 2.6 km || 
|-id=361 bgcolor=#E9E9E9
| 443361 ||  || — || October 8, 2007 || Mount Lemmon || Mount Lemmon Survey || — || align=right | 2.1 km || 
|-id=362 bgcolor=#E9E9E9
| 443362 ||  || — || March 10, 2005 || Anderson Mesa || LONEOS || — || align=right | 2.1 km || 
|-id=363 bgcolor=#E9E9E9
| 443363 ||  || — || December 15, 2004 || Kitt Peak || Spacewatch || — || align=right | 1.4 km || 
|-id=364 bgcolor=#fefefe
| 443364 ||  || — || April 24, 1998 || Kitt Peak || Spacewatch || — || align=right | 1.3 km || 
|-id=365 bgcolor=#E9E9E9
| 443365 ||  || — || September 27, 2011 || Mount Lemmon || Mount Lemmon Survey || — || align=right | 1.7 km || 
|-id=366 bgcolor=#E9E9E9
| 443366 ||  || — || May 18, 1994 || Kitt Peak || Spacewatch || — || align=right | 2.4 km || 
|-id=367 bgcolor=#d6d6d6
| 443367 ||  || — || March 16, 2009 || Kitt Peak || Spacewatch || — || align=right | 2.5 km || 
|-id=368 bgcolor=#E9E9E9
| 443368 ||  || — || May 19, 2006 || Mount Lemmon || Mount Lemmon Survey || — || align=right | 1.3 km || 
|-id=369 bgcolor=#d6d6d6
| 443369 ||  || — || July 9, 2010 || WISE || WISE || — || align=right | 5.1 km || 
|-id=370 bgcolor=#E9E9E9
| 443370 ||  || — || January 1, 2009 || Mount Lemmon || Mount Lemmon Survey || — || align=right | 1.5 km || 
|-id=371 bgcolor=#E9E9E9
| 443371 ||  || — || April 20, 2010 || Mount Lemmon || Mount Lemmon Survey || — || align=right | 1.00 km || 
|-id=372 bgcolor=#d6d6d6
| 443372 ||  || — || October 21, 2006 || Mount Lemmon || Mount Lemmon Survey || — || align=right | 3.2 km || 
|-id=373 bgcolor=#E9E9E9
| 443373 ||  || — || March 1, 2009 || Kitt Peak || Spacewatch || — || align=right | 2.2 km || 
|-id=374 bgcolor=#d6d6d6
| 443374 ||  || — || October 24, 2005 || Kitt Peak || Spacewatch || — || align=right | 3.7 km || 
|-id=375 bgcolor=#d6d6d6
| 443375 ||  || — || May 17, 2009 || Mount Lemmon || Mount Lemmon Survey || — || align=right | 2.8 km || 
|-id=376 bgcolor=#E9E9E9
| 443376 ||  || — || December 8, 2012 || Mount Lemmon || Mount Lemmon Survey || — || align=right | 1.8 km || 
|-id=377 bgcolor=#d6d6d6
| 443377 ||  || — || April 13, 2004 || Kitt Peak || Spacewatch || — || align=right | 2.8 km || 
|-id=378 bgcolor=#d6d6d6
| 443378 ||  || — || June 24, 2010 || WISE || WISE || — || align=right | 3.8 km || 
|-id=379 bgcolor=#fefefe
| 443379 ||  || — || January 31, 2006 || Kitt Peak || Spacewatch || — || align=right data-sort-value="0.76" | 760 m || 
|-id=380 bgcolor=#E9E9E9
| 443380 ||  || — || October 20, 2011 || Mount Lemmon || Mount Lemmon Survey || — || align=right | 2.0 km || 
|-id=381 bgcolor=#E9E9E9
| 443381 ||  || — || November 3, 2007 || Kitt Peak || Spacewatch || — || align=right | 1.3 km || 
|-id=382 bgcolor=#E9E9E9
| 443382 ||  || — || September 28, 2011 || Kitt Peak || Spacewatch || HOF || align=right | 2.1 km || 
|-id=383 bgcolor=#d6d6d6
| 443383 ||  || — || December 19, 2007 || Kitt Peak || Spacewatch || KOR || align=right | 1.3 km || 
|-id=384 bgcolor=#d6d6d6
| 443384 ||  || — || October 18, 2011 || Kitt Peak || Spacewatch || EOS || align=right | 1.9 km || 
|-id=385 bgcolor=#d6d6d6
| 443385 ||  || — || October 30, 2005 || Kitt Peak || Spacewatch || — || align=right | 3.2 km || 
|-id=386 bgcolor=#E9E9E9
| 443386 ||  || — || November 11, 2007 || Mount Lemmon || Mount Lemmon Survey || — || align=right | 1.3 km || 
|-id=387 bgcolor=#E9E9E9
| 443387 ||  || — || April 11, 2005 || Mount Lemmon || Mount Lemmon Survey || AGN || align=right | 1.4 km || 
|-id=388 bgcolor=#E9E9E9
| 443388 ||  || — || April 6, 1994 || Kitt Peak || Spacewatch || — || align=right data-sort-value="0.91" | 910 m || 
|-id=389 bgcolor=#E9E9E9
| 443389 ||  || — || May 14, 2005 || Mount Lemmon || Mount Lemmon Survey || AGN || align=right | 1.1 km || 
|-id=390 bgcolor=#fefefe
| 443390 ||  || — || May 5, 2010 || WISE || WISE || — || align=right data-sort-value="0.61" | 610 m || 
|-id=391 bgcolor=#fefefe
| 443391 ||  || — || October 7, 2005 || Kitt Peak || Spacewatch || — || align=right data-sort-value="0.71" | 710 m || 
|-id=392 bgcolor=#d6d6d6
| 443392 ||  || — || October 10, 2005 || Kitt Peak || Spacewatch || — || align=right | 2.9 km || 
|-id=393 bgcolor=#d6d6d6
| 443393 ||  || — || April 11, 2008 || Mount Lemmon || Mount Lemmon Survey || — || align=right | 4.5 km || 
|-id=394 bgcolor=#E9E9E9
| 443394 ||  || — || May 5, 2006 || Kitt Peak || Spacewatch || MAR || align=right data-sort-value="0.89" | 890 m || 
|-id=395 bgcolor=#d6d6d6
| 443395 ||  || — || October 1, 2005 || Kitt Peak || Spacewatch || — || align=right | 2.8 km || 
|-id=396 bgcolor=#d6d6d6
| 443396 ||  || — || February 9, 2008 || Kitt Peak || Spacewatch || — || align=right | 2.3 km || 
|-id=397 bgcolor=#E9E9E9
| 443397 ||  || — || January 20, 2009 || Kitt Peak || Spacewatch || — || align=right | 1.3 km || 
|-id=398 bgcolor=#d6d6d6
| 443398 ||  || — || March 25, 2014 || Kitt Peak || Spacewatch || — || align=right | 2.6 km || 
|-id=399 bgcolor=#d6d6d6
| 443399 ||  || — || May 22, 2003 || Kitt Peak || Spacewatch || — || align=right | 2.5 km || 
|-id=400 bgcolor=#fefefe
| 443400 ||  || — || February 5, 2000 || Kitt Peak || Spacewatch || — || align=right data-sort-value="0.75" | 750 m || 
|}

443401–443500 

|-bgcolor=#d6d6d6
| 443401 ||  || — || January 18, 2008 || Mount Lemmon || Mount Lemmon Survey || — || align=right | 2.1 km || 
|-id=402 bgcolor=#fefefe
| 443402 ||  || — || July 22, 2004 || Siding Spring || SSS || — || align=right | 1.4 km || 
|-id=403 bgcolor=#d6d6d6
| 443403 ||  || — || October 21, 2011 || Mount Lemmon || Mount Lemmon Survey || — || align=right | 2.7 km || 
|-id=404 bgcolor=#E9E9E9
| 443404 ||  || — || January 6, 2013 || Kitt Peak || Spacewatch || WIT || align=right data-sort-value="0.88" | 880 m || 
|-id=405 bgcolor=#d6d6d6
| 443405 ||  || — || August 28, 2005 || Kitt Peak || Spacewatch || — || align=right | 2.2 km || 
|-id=406 bgcolor=#E9E9E9
| 443406 ||  || — || January 5, 2013 || Kitt Peak || Spacewatch || — || align=right | 1.4 km || 
|-id=407 bgcolor=#d6d6d6
| 443407 ||  || — || April 24, 2014 || Mount Lemmon || Mount Lemmon Survey || — || align=right | 2.8 km || 
|-id=408 bgcolor=#fefefe
| 443408 ||  || — || December 18, 2009 || Mount Lemmon || Mount Lemmon Survey || — || align=right data-sort-value="0.67" | 670 m || 
|-id=409 bgcolor=#E9E9E9
| 443409 ||  || — || November 8, 2007 || Kitt Peak || Spacewatch || AGN || align=right | 1.1 km || 
|-id=410 bgcolor=#E9E9E9
| 443410 ||  || — || May 12, 2010 || Kitt Peak || Spacewatch || — || align=right | 1.4 km || 
|-id=411 bgcolor=#E9E9E9
| 443411 ||  || — || April 6, 2005 || Mount Lemmon || Mount Lemmon Survey || — || align=right | 1.8 km || 
|-id=412 bgcolor=#fefefe
| 443412 ||  || — || November 11, 2001 || Kitt Peak || Spacewatch || — || align=right data-sort-value="0.71" | 710 m || 
|-id=413 bgcolor=#E9E9E9
| 443413 ||  || — || June 22, 2006 || Kitt Peak || Spacewatch || — || align=right | 1.3 km || 
|-id=414 bgcolor=#fefefe
| 443414 ||  || — || January 28, 2006 || Kitt Peak || Spacewatch || — || align=right data-sort-value="0.77" | 770 m || 
|-id=415 bgcolor=#fefefe
| 443415 ||  || — || October 30, 2005 || Kitt Peak || Spacewatch || — || align=right data-sort-value="0.81" | 810 m || 
|-id=416 bgcolor=#d6d6d6
| 443416 ||  || — || February 28, 2008 || Mount Lemmon || Mount Lemmon Survey || THM || align=right | 1.8 km || 
|-id=417 bgcolor=#E9E9E9
| 443417 ||  || — || October 10, 2007 || Kitt Peak || Spacewatch || AGN || align=right | 1.1 km || 
|-id=418 bgcolor=#E9E9E9
| 443418 ||  || — || May 21, 2006 || Mount Lemmon || Mount Lemmon Survey || — || align=right data-sort-value="0.84" | 840 m || 
|-id=419 bgcolor=#d6d6d6
| 443419 ||  || — || June 30, 2005 || Kitt Peak || Spacewatch || KOR || align=right | 1.3 km || 
|-id=420 bgcolor=#d6d6d6
| 443420 ||  || — || May 29, 2010 || WISE || WISE || EOS || align=right | 2.7 km || 
|-id=421 bgcolor=#E9E9E9
| 443421 ||  || — || February 28, 2009 || Kitt Peak || Spacewatch || — || align=right | 2.2 km || 
|-id=422 bgcolor=#E9E9E9
| 443422 ||  || — || August 18, 2006 || Kitt Peak || Spacewatch || — || align=right | 1.7 km || 
|-id=423 bgcolor=#E9E9E9
| 443423 ||  || — || April 24, 2006 || Kitt Peak || Spacewatch || — || align=right data-sort-value="0.86" | 860 m || 
|-id=424 bgcolor=#d6d6d6
| 443424 ||  || — || December 25, 2005 || Kitt Peak || Spacewatch || — || align=right | 3.2 km || 
|-id=425 bgcolor=#d6d6d6
| 443425 ||  || — || March 19, 2009 || Kitt Peak || Spacewatch || — || align=right | 2.2 km || 
|-id=426 bgcolor=#E9E9E9
| 443426 ||  || — || January 16, 2009 || Mount Lemmon || Mount Lemmon Survey || — || align=right data-sort-value="0.94" | 940 m || 
|-id=427 bgcolor=#fefefe
| 443427 ||  || — || January 25, 2006 || Kitt Peak || Spacewatch || — || align=right data-sort-value="0.76" | 760 m || 
|-id=428 bgcolor=#d6d6d6
| 443428 ||  || — || November 18, 2011 || Mount Lemmon || Mount Lemmon Survey || — || align=right | 2.0 km || 
|-id=429 bgcolor=#E9E9E9
| 443429 ||  || — || September 25, 2007 || Mount Lemmon || Mount Lemmon Survey || — || align=right | 1.2 km || 
|-id=430 bgcolor=#E9E9E9
| 443430 ||  || — || November 20, 2007 || Mount Lemmon || Mount Lemmon Survey || — || align=right | 2.2 km || 
|-id=431 bgcolor=#fefefe
| 443431 ||  || — || August 29, 2011 || Siding Spring || SSS || — || align=right | 1.2 km || 
|-id=432 bgcolor=#E9E9E9
| 443432 ||  || — || September 28, 2006 || Kitt Peak || Spacewatch || AGN || align=right | 1.1 km || 
|-id=433 bgcolor=#d6d6d6
| 443433 ||  || — || February 23, 1998 || Kitt Peak || Spacewatch || — || align=right | 2.2 km || 
|-id=434 bgcolor=#d6d6d6
| 443434 ||  || — || January 19, 2013 || Mount Lemmon || Mount Lemmon Survey || — || align=right | 1.9 km || 
|-id=435 bgcolor=#fefefe
| 443435 ||  || — || September 21, 1996 || Xinglong || SCAP || — || align=right data-sort-value="0.98" | 980 m || 
|-id=436 bgcolor=#d6d6d6
| 443436 ||  || — || January 19, 2013 || Mount Lemmon || Mount Lemmon Survey || KOR || align=right | 1.2 km || 
|-id=437 bgcolor=#d6d6d6
| 443437 ||  || — || September 6, 2008 || Mount Lemmon || Mount Lemmon Survey || SHU3:2 || align=right | 5.1 km || 
|-id=438 bgcolor=#E9E9E9
| 443438 ||  || — || November 18, 2007 || Mount Lemmon || Mount Lemmon Survey || — || align=right | 2.1 km || 
|-id=439 bgcolor=#E9E9E9
| 443439 ||  || — || March 19, 2009 || Mount Lemmon || Mount Lemmon Survey || — || align=right | 1.8 km || 
|-id=440 bgcolor=#E9E9E9
| 443440 ||  || — || October 8, 1993 || Kitt Peak || Spacewatch || — || align=right | 2.4 km || 
|-id=441 bgcolor=#E9E9E9
| 443441 ||  || — || September 7, 2011 || Kitt Peak || Spacewatch || AGN || align=right | 1.1 km || 
|-id=442 bgcolor=#d6d6d6
| 443442 ||  || — || October 1, 2005 || Mount Lemmon || Mount Lemmon Survey || — || align=right | 2.9 km || 
|-id=443 bgcolor=#E9E9E9
| 443443 ||  || — || October 20, 2007 || Mount Lemmon || Mount Lemmon Survey || NEM || align=right | 2.2 km || 
|-id=444 bgcolor=#d6d6d6
| 443444 ||  || — || June 29, 2010 || WISE || WISE || HYG || align=right | 2.9 km || 
|-id=445 bgcolor=#d6d6d6
| 443445 ||  || — || February 28, 2008 || Mount Lemmon || Mount Lemmon Survey || HYG || align=right | 2.5 km || 
|-id=446 bgcolor=#E9E9E9
| 443446 ||  || — || February 5, 2000 || Kitt Peak || Spacewatch || NEM || align=right | 2.2 km || 
|-id=447 bgcolor=#d6d6d6
| 443447 ||  || — || March 26, 2009 || Mount Lemmon || Mount Lemmon Survey || — || align=right | 2.6 km || 
|-id=448 bgcolor=#E9E9E9
| 443448 ||  || — || January 19, 2013 || Kitt Peak || Spacewatch || — || align=right | 2.2 km || 
|-id=449 bgcolor=#d6d6d6
| 443449 ||  || — || July 12, 2010 || WISE || WISE || — || align=right | 2.2 km || 
|-id=450 bgcolor=#fefefe
| 443450 ||  || — || September 13, 2004 || Kitt Peak || Spacewatch || — || align=right data-sort-value="0.98" | 980 m || 
|-id=451 bgcolor=#E9E9E9
| 443451 ||  || — || September 22, 2011 || Kitt Peak || Spacewatch || — || align=right | 2.2 km || 
|-id=452 bgcolor=#d6d6d6
| 443452 ||  || — || December 13, 2006 || Kitt Peak || Spacewatch || — || align=right | 3.3 km || 
|-id=453 bgcolor=#E9E9E9
| 443453 ||  || — || August 30, 2006 || Anderson Mesa || LONEOS || — || align=right | 2.5 km || 
|-id=454 bgcolor=#E9E9E9
| 443454 ||  || — || October 15, 2007 || Catalina || CSS || — || align=right | 2.0 km || 
|-id=455 bgcolor=#E9E9E9
| 443455 ||  || — || September 17, 2006 || Catalina || CSS || — || align=right | 2.9 km || 
|-id=456 bgcolor=#d6d6d6
| 443456 ||  || — || January 9, 2007 || Kitt Peak || Spacewatch || — || align=right | 3.3 km || 
|-id=457 bgcolor=#fefefe
| 443457 ||  || — || November 21, 2008 || Mount Lemmon || Mount Lemmon Survey || — || align=right data-sort-value="0.98" | 980 m || 
|-id=458 bgcolor=#E9E9E9
| 443458 ||  || — || December 4, 2007 || Kitt Peak || Spacewatch || NEM || align=right | 2.4 km || 
|-id=459 bgcolor=#E9E9E9
| 443459 ||  || — || October 16, 2007 || Kitt Peak || Spacewatch || — || align=right | 1.4 km || 
|-id=460 bgcolor=#d6d6d6
| 443460 ||  || — || June 12, 2004 || Socorro || LINEAR || — || align=right | 3.5 km || 
|-id=461 bgcolor=#d6d6d6
| 443461 ||  || — || March 2, 2009 || Kitt Peak || Spacewatch || — || align=right | 2.9 km || 
|-id=462 bgcolor=#d6d6d6
| 443462 ||  || — || May 26, 2003 || Kitt Peak || Spacewatch || — || align=right | 3.2 km || 
|-id=463 bgcolor=#E9E9E9
| 443463 ||  || — || November 4, 1991 || Kitt Peak || Spacewatch || EUN || align=right | 1.6 km || 
|-id=464 bgcolor=#fefefe
| 443464 ||  || — || July 28, 2011 || Siding Spring || SSS || V || align=right data-sort-value="0.84" | 840 m || 
|-id=465 bgcolor=#E9E9E9
| 443465 ||  || — || August 19, 2006 || Kitt Peak || Spacewatch || — || align=right | 1.9 km || 
|-id=466 bgcolor=#d6d6d6
| 443466 ||  || — || March 8, 2008 || Mount Lemmon || Mount Lemmon Survey || — || align=right | 3.6 km || 
|-id=467 bgcolor=#d6d6d6
| 443467 ||  || — || October 2, 2006 || Mount Lemmon || Mount Lemmon Survey || KOR || align=right | 1.2 km || 
|-id=468 bgcolor=#d6d6d6
| 443468 ||  || — || December 20, 2007 || Kitt Peak || Spacewatch || KOR || align=right | 1.1 km || 
|-id=469 bgcolor=#fefefe
| 443469 ||  || — || February 16, 2010 || Kitt Peak || Spacewatch || — || align=right data-sort-value="0.74" | 740 m || 
|-id=470 bgcolor=#d6d6d6
| 443470 ||  || — || January 13, 2008 || Kitt Peak || Spacewatch || KOR || align=right | 1.1 km || 
|-id=471 bgcolor=#d6d6d6
| 443471 ||  || — || October 28, 2011 || Mount Lemmon || Mount Lemmon Survey || — || align=right | 2.7 km || 
|-id=472 bgcolor=#d6d6d6
| 443472 ||  || — || May 1, 2009 || Mount Lemmon || Mount Lemmon Survey || — || align=right | 2.5 km || 
|-id=473 bgcolor=#E9E9E9
| 443473 ||  || — || November 24, 2008 || Mount Lemmon || Mount Lemmon Survey || — || align=right | 1.6 km || 
|-id=474 bgcolor=#d6d6d6
| 443474 ||  || — || June 7, 2010 || WISE || WISE || — || align=right | 4.1 km || 
|-id=475 bgcolor=#d6d6d6
| 443475 ||  || — || August 30, 2005 || Kitt Peak || Spacewatch || — || align=right | 2.5 km || 
|-id=476 bgcolor=#E9E9E9
| 443476 ||  || — || October 23, 2011 || Mount Lemmon || Mount Lemmon Survey || — || align=right | 1.8 km || 
|-id=477 bgcolor=#E9E9E9
| 443477 ||  || — || October 10, 2007 || Mount Lemmon || Mount Lemmon Survey || — || align=right data-sort-value="0.85" | 850 m || 
|-id=478 bgcolor=#E9E9E9
| 443478 ||  || — || September 22, 2011 || Kitt Peak || Spacewatch || — || align=right | 1.6 km || 
|-id=479 bgcolor=#d6d6d6
| 443479 ||  || — || October 28, 2005 || Kitt Peak || Spacewatch || — || align=right | 2.8 km || 
|-id=480 bgcolor=#E9E9E9
| 443480 ||  || — || October 10, 2007 || Mount Lemmon || Mount Lemmon Survey || EUN || align=right | 1.5 km || 
|-id=481 bgcolor=#E9E9E9
| 443481 ||  || — || October 29, 2003 || Kitt Peak || Spacewatch || — || align=right | 1.3 km || 
|-id=482 bgcolor=#fefefe
| 443482 ||  || — || January 16, 2013 || Mount Lemmon || Mount Lemmon Survey || V || align=right data-sort-value="0.72" | 720 m || 
|-id=483 bgcolor=#fefefe
| 443483 ||  || — || October 25, 2008 || Mount Lemmon || Mount Lemmon Survey || V || align=right data-sort-value="0.82" | 820 m || 
|-id=484 bgcolor=#E9E9E9
| 443484 ||  || — || May 10, 2005 || Mount Lemmon || Mount Lemmon Survey || — || align=right | 2.7 km || 
|-id=485 bgcolor=#d6d6d6
| 443485 ||  || — || November 17, 2011 || Mount Lemmon || Mount Lemmon Survey || URS || align=right | 3.8 km || 
|-id=486 bgcolor=#d6d6d6
| 443486 ||  || — || November 5, 2005 || Mount Lemmon || Mount Lemmon Survey || — || align=right | 5.2 km || 
|-id=487 bgcolor=#E9E9E9
| 443487 ||  || — || March 10, 2005 || Kitt Peak || Spacewatch || — || align=right | 1.5 km || 
|-id=488 bgcolor=#E9E9E9
| 443488 ||  || — || March 3, 2009 || Catalina || CSS || — || align=right | 2.2 km || 
|-id=489 bgcolor=#d6d6d6
| 443489 ||  || — || May 26, 2003 || Kitt Peak || Spacewatch || — || align=right | 3.1 km || 
|-id=490 bgcolor=#E9E9E9
| 443490 ||  || — || June 10, 2005 || Kitt Peak || Spacewatch || — || align=right | 3.6 km || 
|-id=491 bgcolor=#d6d6d6
| 443491 ||  || — || December 25, 2006 || Kitt Peak || Spacewatch || — || align=right | 2.8 km || 
|-id=492 bgcolor=#E9E9E9
| 443492 ||  || — || November 28, 1995 || Kitt Peak || Spacewatch || — || align=right | 1.3 km || 
|-id=493 bgcolor=#d6d6d6
| 443493 ||  || — || June 25, 2010 || WISE || WISE || — || align=right | 4.7 km || 
|-id=494 bgcolor=#d6d6d6
| 443494 ||  || — || April 17, 2009 || Mount Lemmon || Mount Lemmon Survey || — || align=right | 2.5 km || 
|-id=495 bgcolor=#d6d6d6
| 443495 ||  || — || January 17, 2013 || Kitt Peak || Spacewatch || — || align=right | 2.6 km || 
|-id=496 bgcolor=#d6d6d6
| 443496 ||  || — || March 2, 2013 || Mount Lemmon || Mount Lemmon Survey || — || align=right | 2.5 km || 
|-id=497 bgcolor=#d6d6d6
| 443497 ||  || — || December 24, 2006 || Kitt Peak || Spacewatch || — || align=right | 2.8 km || 
|-id=498 bgcolor=#E9E9E9
| 443498 ||  || — || January 31, 2009 || Kitt Peak || Spacewatch || — || align=right | 1.6 km || 
|-id=499 bgcolor=#E9E9E9
| 443499 ||  || — || March 2, 2009 || Mount Lemmon || Mount Lemmon Survey || — || align=right | 2.0 km || 
|-id=500 bgcolor=#d6d6d6
| 443500 ||  || — || September 30, 2006 || Mount Lemmon || Mount Lemmon Survey || KOR || align=right | 1.3 km || 
|}

443501–443600 

|-bgcolor=#E9E9E9
| 443501 ||  || — || September 17, 2006 || Kitt Peak || Spacewatch || — || align=right | 2.3 km || 
|-id=502 bgcolor=#d6d6d6
| 443502 ||  || — || October 21, 2006 || Mount Lemmon || Mount Lemmon Survey || KOR || align=right | 1.3 km || 
|-id=503 bgcolor=#d6d6d6
| 443503 ||  || — || September 10, 2004 || Kitt Peak || Spacewatch || THM || align=right | 3.4 km || 
|-id=504 bgcolor=#fefefe
| 443504 ||  || — || April 19, 2006 || Mount Lemmon || Mount Lemmon Survey || — || align=right | 1.2 km || 
|-id=505 bgcolor=#d6d6d6
| 443505 ||  || — || October 27, 2005 || Catalina || CSS || — || align=right | 3.7 km || 
|-id=506 bgcolor=#E9E9E9
| 443506 ||  || — || September 21, 2011 || Mount Lemmon || Mount Lemmon Survey || — || align=right | 2.3 km || 
|-id=507 bgcolor=#d6d6d6
| 443507 ||  || — || November 16, 2006 || Kitt Peak || Spacewatch || — || align=right | 2.4 km || 
|-id=508 bgcolor=#d6d6d6
| 443508 ||  || — || November 15, 2006 || Mount Lemmon || Mount Lemmon Survey || — || align=right | 3.2 km || 
|-id=509 bgcolor=#d6d6d6
| 443509 ||  || — || November 24, 2011 || Mount Lemmon || Mount Lemmon Survey || KOR || align=right | 1.3 km || 
|-id=510 bgcolor=#E9E9E9
| 443510 ||  || — || December 12, 2012 || Kitt Peak || Spacewatch || — || align=right data-sort-value="0.83" | 830 m || 
|-id=511 bgcolor=#E9E9E9
| 443511 ||  || — || January 16, 2004 || Kitt Peak || Spacewatch || — || align=right | 1.4 km || 
|-id=512 bgcolor=#E9E9E9
| 443512 ||  || — || April 5, 2005 || Mount Lemmon || Mount Lemmon Survey || — || align=right | 1.3 km || 
|-id=513 bgcolor=#d6d6d6
| 443513 ||  || — || October 30, 2005 || Kitt Peak || Spacewatch || — || align=right | 3.3 km || 
|-id=514 bgcolor=#d6d6d6
| 443514 ||  || — || April 3, 2008 || Kitt Peak || Spacewatch || — || align=right | 2.7 km || 
|-id=515 bgcolor=#d6d6d6
| 443515 ||  || — || October 6, 2005 || Kitt Peak || Spacewatch || — || align=right | 2.5 km || 
|-id=516 bgcolor=#d6d6d6
| 443516 ||  || — || March 4, 2008 || Mount Lemmon || Mount Lemmon Survey || — || align=right | 2.5 km || 
|-id=517 bgcolor=#d6d6d6
| 443517 ||  || — || January 10, 2008 || Mount Lemmon || Mount Lemmon Survey || — || align=right | 2.1 km || 
|-id=518 bgcolor=#d6d6d6
| 443518 ||  || — || December 13, 2006 || Kitt Peak || Spacewatch || — || align=right | 3.1 km || 
|-id=519 bgcolor=#E9E9E9
| 443519 ||  || — || March 1, 2009 || Kitt Peak || Spacewatch || — || align=right | 2.2 km || 
|-id=520 bgcolor=#fefefe
| 443520 ||  || — || April 14, 2010 || Kitt Peak || Spacewatch || — || align=right data-sort-value="0.85" | 850 m || 
|-id=521 bgcolor=#d6d6d6
| 443521 ||  || — || August 22, 2004 || Kitt Peak || Spacewatch || — || align=right | 2.9 km || 
|-id=522 bgcolor=#E9E9E9
| 443522 ||  || — || November 2, 2007 || Mount Lemmon || Mount Lemmon Survey || DOR || align=right | 2.1 km || 
|-id=523 bgcolor=#E9E9E9
| 443523 ||  || — || September 24, 2006 || Kitt Peak || Spacewatch || AEO || align=right | 1.0 km || 
|-id=524 bgcolor=#E9E9E9
| 443524 ||  || — || January 11, 2008 || Kitt Peak || Spacewatch || — || align=right | 2.4 km || 
|-id=525 bgcolor=#d6d6d6
| 443525 ||  || — || March 6, 2008 || Kitt Peak || Spacewatch || LIX || align=right | 3.3 km || 
|-id=526 bgcolor=#d6d6d6
| 443526 ||  || — || January 10, 2008 || Mount Lemmon || Mount Lemmon Survey || — || align=right | 2.5 km || 
|-id=527 bgcolor=#d6d6d6
| 443527 ||  || — || March 30, 2008 || Kitt Peak || Spacewatch || — || align=right | 2.9 km || 
|-id=528 bgcolor=#fefefe
| 443528 ||  || — || December 31, 2005 || Kitt Peak || Spacewatch || — || align=right data-sort-value="0.87" | 870 m || 
|-id=529 bgcolor=#E9E9E9
| 443529 ||  || — || October 30, 2007 || Mount Lemmon || Mount Lemmon Survey || — || align=right | 2.0 km || 
|-id=530 bgcolor=#E9E9E9
| 443530 ||  || — || November 27, 1995 || Kitt Peak || Spacewatch || — || align=right | 1.3 km || 
|-id=531 bgcolor=#E9E9E9
| 443531 ||  || — || January 2, 2009 || Kitt Peak || Spacewatch || — || align=right | 2.3 km || 
|-id=532 bgcolor=#d6d6d6
| 443532 ||  || — || October 1, 2005 || Mount Lemmon || Mount Lemmon Survey || THM || align=right | 2.2 km || 
|-id=533 bgcolor=#E9E9E9
| 443533 ||  || — || October 2, 2006 || Mount Lemmon || Mount Lemmon Survey || — || align=right | 2.4 km || 
|-id=534 bgcolor=#d6d6d6
| 443534 ||  || — || February 29, 2008 || Mount Lemmon || Mount Lemmon Survey || — || align=right | 2.7 km || 
|-id=535 bgcolor=#d6d6d6
| 443535 ||  || — || April 4, 2008 || Mount Lemmon || Mount Lemmon Survey || — || align=right | 3.3 km || 
|-id=536 bgcolor=#d6d6d6
| 443536 ||  || — || January 6, 2013 || Kitt Peak || Spacewatch || — || align=right | 2.5 km || 
|-id=537 bgcolor=#d6d6d6
| 443537 ||  || — || September 4, 2010 || Kitt Peak || Spacewatch || — || align=right | 2.9 km || 
|-id=538 bgcolor=#d6d6d6
| 443538 ||  || — || February 28, 2008 || Kitt Peak || Spacewatch || EOS || align=right | 2.0 km || 
|-id=539 bgcolor=#E9E9E9
| 443539 ||  || — || April 25, 2006 || Mount Lemmon || Mount Lemmon Survey || — || align=right | 1.2 km || 
|-id=540 bgcolor=#E9E9E9
| 443540 ||  || — || March 12, 2010 || WISE || WISE || — || align=right | 1.5 km || 
|-id=541 bgcolor=#d6d6d6
| 443541 ||  || — || January 16, 2013 || Mount Lemmon || Mount Lemmon Survey || — || align=right | 2.7 km || 
|-id=542 bgcolor=#E9E9E9
| 443542 ||  || — || March 1, 2009 || Kitt Peak || Spacewatch || HOF || align=right | 2.7 km || 
|-id=543 bgcolor=#E9E9E9
| 443543 ||  || — || April 17, 2005 || Kitt Peak || Spacewatch || — || align=right | 1.4 km || 
|-id=544 bgcolor=#d6d6d6
| 443544 ||  || — || February 9, 2008 || Kitt Peak || Spacewatch || — || align=right | 2.5 km || 
|-id=545 bgcolor=#d6d6d6
| 443545 ||  || — || March 5, 2008 || Kitt Peak || Spacewatch || — || align=right | 2.6 km || 
|-id=546 bgcolor=#d6d6d6
| 443546 ||  || — || April 26, 2009 || Kitt Peak || Spacewatch || KOR || align=right | 1.2 km || 
|-id=547 bgcolor=#d6d6d6
| 443547 ||  || — || March 31, 2008 || Mount Lemmon || Mount Lemmon Survey || — || align=right | 2.0 km || 
|-id=548 bgcolor=#d6d6d6
| 443548 ||  || — || March 11, 2008 || Mount Lemmon || Mount Lemmon Survey || — || align=right | 2.5 km || 
|-id=549 bgcolor=#d6d6d6
| 443549 ||  || — || September 8, 2004 || Socorro || LINEAR || — || align=right | 3.5 km || 
|-id=550 bgcolor=#d6d6d6
| 443550 ||  || — || February 24, 2009 || Mount Lemmon || Mount Lemmon Survey || — || align=right | 2.1 km || 
|-id=551 bgcolor=#d6d6d6
| 443551 ||  || — || February 7, 2013 || Kitt Peak || Spacewatch || EOS || align=right | 1.9 km || 
|-id=552 bgcolor=#d6d6d6
| 443552 ||  || — || April 22, 2009 || Mount Lemmon || Mount Lemmon Survey || — || align=right | 2.7 km || 
|-id=553 bgcolor=#fefefe
| 443553 ||  || — || September 7, 2000 || Kitt Peak || Spacewatch || — || align=right | 1.1 km || 
|-id=554 bgcolor=#d6d6d6
| 443554 ||  || — || October 17, 2006 || Mount Lemmon || Mount Lemmon Survey || — || align=right | 2.6 km || 
|-id=555 bgcolor=#E9E9E9
| 443555 ||  || — || November 5, 2007 || Kitt Peak || Spacewatch || — || align=right | 1.9 km || 
|-id=556 bgcolor=#d6d6d6
| 443556 ||  || — || November 1, 2005 || Kitt Peak || Spacewatch || — || align=right | 2.3 km || 
|-id=557 bgcolor=#d6d6d6
| 443557 ||  || — || April 8, 2003 || Kitt Peak || Spacewatch || (5651) || align=right | 3.7 km || 
|-id=558 bgcolor=#E9E9E9
| 443558 ||  || — || August 21, 2006 || Kitt Peak || Spacewatch || — || align=right | 2.6 km || 
|-id=559 bgcolor=#fefefe
| 443559 ||  || — || December 26, 1995 || Kitt Peak || Spacewatch || — || align=right data-sort-value="0.90" | 900 m || 
|-id=560 bgcolor=#fefefe
| 443560 ||  || — || November 25, 2005 || Catalina || CSS || V || align=right data-sort-value="0.75" | 750 m || 
|-id=561 bgcolor=#E9E9E9
| 443561 ||  || — || April 29, 2006 || Kitt Peak || Spacewatch || — || align=right | 1.2 km || 
|-id=562 bgcolor=#d6d6d6
| 443562 ||  || — || January 17, 2007 || Kitt Peak || Spacewatch || — || align=right | 4.1 km || 
|-id=563 bgcolor=#d6d6d6
| 443563 ||  || — || May 3, 2014 || Mount Lemmon || Mount Lemmon Survey || — || align=right | 2.5 km || 
|-id=564 bgcolor=#d6d6d6
| 443564 ||  || — || October 8, 2004 || Kitt Peak || Spacewatch || — || align=right | 2.3 km || 
|-id=565 bgcolor=#d6d6d6
| 443565 ||  || — || November 1, 2005 || Mount Lemmon || Mount Lemmon Survey || fast? || align=right | 2.9 km || 
|-id=566 bgcolor=#E9E9E9
| 443566 ||  || — || November 26, 2003 || Kitt Peak || Spacewatch || — || align=right | 1.4 km || 
|-id=567 bgcolor=#E9E9E9
| 443567 ||  || — || November 26, 2003 || Kitt Peak || Spacewatch || — || align=right | 1.7 km || 
|-id=568 bgcolor=#E9E9E9
| 443568 ||  || — || September 21, 2011 || Mount Lemmon || Mount Lemmon Survey || — || align=right data-sort-value="0.87" | 870 m || 
|-id=569 bgcolor=#E9E9E9
| 443569 ||  || — || April 10, 2005 || Mount Lemmon || Mount Lemmon Survey || — || align=right | 2.5 km || 
|-id=570 bgcolor=#d6d6d6
| 443570 ||  || — || February 17, 2013 || Kitt Peak || Spacewatch || — || align=right | 2.9 km || 
|-id=571 bgcolor=#d6d6d6
| 443571 ||  || — || April 20, 2009 || Kitt Peak || Spacewatch || — || align=right | 4.4 km || 
|-id=572 bgcolor=#d6d6d6
| 443572 ||  || — || October 13, 2010 || Mount Lemmon || Mount Lemmon Survey || — || align=right | 2.8 km || 
|-id=573 bgcolor=#d6d6d6
| 443573 ||  || — || April 3, 2008 || Mount Lemmon || Mount Lemmon Survey || — || align=right | 2.8 km || 
|-id=574 bgcolor=#d6d6d6
| 443574 ||  || — || April 8, 2003 || Kitt Peak || Spacewatch || EOS || align=right | 1.7 km || 
|-id=575 bgcolor=#d6d6d6
| 443575 ||  || — || April 11, 2008 || Kitt Peak || Spacewatch || — || align=right | 3.1 km || 
|-id=576 bgcolor=#d6d6d6
| 443576 ||  || — || May 5, 2008 || Mount Lemmon || Mount Lemmon Survey || — || align=right | 2.9 km || 
|-id=577 bgcolor=#E9E9E9
| 443577 ||  || — || November 13, 2012 || Mount Lemmon || Mount Lemmon Survey || MAR || align=right | 1.5 km || 
|-id=578 bgcolor=#fefefe
| 443578 ||  || — || December 13, 2012 || Mount Lemmon || Mount Lemmon Survey || — || align=right data-sort-value="0.79" | 790 m || 
|-id=579 bgcolor=#d6d6d6
| 443579 ||  || — || October 24, 1995 || Kitt Peak || Spacewatch || EOS || align=right | 1.6 km || 
|-id=580 bgcolor=#E9E9E9
| 443580 ||  || — || December 29, 2003 || Kitt Peak || Spacewatch || — || align=right | 1.9 km || 
|-id=581 bgcolor=#d6d6d6
| 443581 ||  || — || March 8, 2008 || Kitt Peak || Spacewatch || EOS || align=right | 2.1 km || 
|-id=582 bgcolor=#d6d6d6
| 443582 ||  || — || January 17, 2007 || Kitt Peak || Spacewatch || — || align=right | 2.6 km || 
|-id=583 bgcolor=#d6d6d6
| 443583 ||  || — || October 27, 2005 || Catalina || CSS || — || align=right | 3.2 km || 
|-id=584 bgcolor=#d6d6d6
| 443584 ||  || — || September 11, 2004 || Kitt Peak || Spacewatch || VER || align=right | 3.1 km || 
|-id=585 bgcolor=#d6d6d6
| 443585 ||  || — || June 30, 2010 || WISE || WISE || — || align=right | 4.3 km || 
|-id=586 bgcolor=#E9E9E9
| 443586 ||  || — || September 18, 2003 || Kitt Peak || Spacewatch || — || align=right | 1.3 km || 
|-id=587 bgcolor=#d6d6d6
| 443587 ||  || — || October 29, 2010 || Kitt Peak || Spacewatch || — || align=right | 3.4 km || 
|-id=588 bgcolor=#d6d6d6
| 443588 ||  || — || March 31, 2008 || Mount Lemmon || Mount Lemmon Survey || — || align=right | 3.0 km || 
|-id=589 bgcolor=#d6d6d6
| 443589 ||  || — || April 11, 2003 || Kitt Peak || Spacewatch || — || align=right | 3.4 km || 
|-id=590 bgcolor=#fefefe
| 443590 ||  || — || January 14, 2002 || Kitt Peak || Spacewatch || — || align=right | 1.2 km || 
|-id=591 bgcolor=#E9E9E9
| 443591 ||  || — || November 11, 2007 || Catalina || CSS || — || align=right | 1.7 km || 
|-id=592 bgcolor=#E9E9E9
| 443592 ||  || — || July 22, 2006 || Mount Lemmon || Mount Lemmon Survey || — || align=right | 2.1 km || 
|-id=593 bgcolor=#d6d6d6
| 443593 ||  || — || July 9, 2010 || WISE || WISE || — || align=right | 3.1 km || 
|-id=594 bgcolor=#d6d6d6
| 443594 ||  || — || December 13, 2006 || Mount Lemmon || Mount Lemmon Survey || EOS || align=right | 2.2 km || 
|-id=595 bgcolor=#d6d6d6
| 443595 ||  || — || November 1, 2005 || Mount Lemmon || Mount Lemmon Survey || EOS || align=right | 2.5 km || 
|-id=596 bgcolor=#fefefe
| 443596 ||  || — || September 25, 2000 || Kitt Peak || Spacewatch || — || align=right | 1.1 km || 
|-id=597 bgcolor=#d6d6d6
| 443597 ||  || — || May 2, 2008 || Kitt Peak || Spacewatch || — || align=right | 2.8 km || 
|-id=598 bgcolor=#d6d6d6
| 443598 ||  || — || December 31, 2007 || Mount Lemmon || Mount Lemmon Survey || — || align=right | 2.1 km || 
|-id=599 bgcolor=#d6d6d6
| 443599 ||  || — || November 26, 2005 || Catalina || CSS || — || align=right | 4.3 km || 
|-id=600 bgcolor=#d6d6d6
| 443600 ||  || — || October 11, 2010 || Mount Lemmon || Mount Lemmon Survey || — || align=right | 3.6 km || 
|}

443601–443700 

|-bgcolor=#d6d6d6
| 443601 ||  || — || April 4, 2008 || Mount Lemmon || Mount Lemmon Survey || HYG || align=right | 2.5 km || 
|-id=602 bgcolor=#d6d6d6
| 443602 ||  || — || November 29, 2005 || Kitt Peak || Spacewatch || — || align=right | 3.4 km || 
|-id=603 bgcolor=#d6d6d6
| 443603 ||  || — || April 13, 2008 || Kitt Peak || Spacewatch || — || align=right | 3.2 km || 
|-id=604 bgcolor=#d6d6d6
| 443604 ||  || — || December 10, 2001 || Socorro || LINEAR || — || align=right | 4.0 km || 
|-id=605 bgcolor=#E9E9E9
| 443605 ||  || — || November 16, 1995 || Kitt Peak || Spacewatch || — || align=right | 1.1 km || 
|-id=606 bgcolor=#d6d6d6
| 443606 ||  || — || December 26, 2006 || Kitt Peak || Spacewatch || EOS || align=right | 1.9 km || 
|-id=607 bgcolor=#E9E9E9
| 443607 ||  || — || November 15, 2007 || Mount Lemmon || Mount Lemmon Survey || — || align=right | 1.7 km || 
|-id=608 bgcolor=#d6d6d6
| 443608 ||  || — || April 15, 2008 || Mount Lemmon || Mount Lemmon Survey || — || align=right | 3.3 km || 
|-id=609 bgcolor=#d6d6d6
| 443609 ||  || — || February 13, 2002 || Kitt Peak || Spacewatch || — || align=right | 3.3 km || 
|-id=610 bgcolor=#d6d6d6
| 443610 ||  || — || October 30, 2005 || Kitt Peak || Spacewatch || — || align=right | 3.0 km || 
|-id=611 bgcolor=#d6d6d6
| 443611 ||  || — || June 15, 2009 || Mount Lemmon || Mount Lemmon Survey || — || align=right | 3.4 km || 
|-id=612 bgcolor=#fefefe
| 443612 ||  || — || December 27, 2005 || Kitt Peak || Spacewatch || — || align=right data-sort-value="0.81" | 810 m || 
|-id=613 bgcolor=#d6d6d6
| 443613 ||  || — || January 13, 2002 || Socorro || LINEAR || — || align=right | 3.3 km || 
|-id=614 bgcolor=#d6d6d6
| 443614 ||  || — || September 3, 2010 || Mount Lemmon || Mount Lemmon Survey || EOS || align=right | 2.3 km || 
|-id=615 bgcolor=#d6d6d6
| 443615 ||  || — || December 19, 2001 || Kitt Peak || Spacewatch || — || align=right | 2.8 km || 
|-id=616 bgcolor=#d6d6d6
| 443616 ||  || — || October 28, 2005 || Mount Lemmon || Mount Lemmon Survey || — || align=right | 3.7 km || 
|-id=617 bgcolor=#d6d6d6
| 443617 ||  || — || November 29, 2005 || Kitt Peak || Spacewatch || VER || align=right | 2.7 km || 
|-id=618 bgcolor=#d6d6d6
| 443618 ||  || — || October 8, 2005 || Kitt Peak || Spacewatch || — || align=right | 3.1 km || 
|-id=619 bgcolor=#E9E9E9
| 443619 ||  || — || February 21, 2010 || WISE || WISE || — || align=right | 2.9 km || 
|-id=620 bgcolor=#d6d6d6
| 443620 ||  || — || October 4, 2004 || Kitt Peak || Spacewatch || — || align=right | 3.2 km || 
|-id=621 bgcolor=#d6d6d6
| 443621 ||  || — || November 30, 2005 || Mount Lemmon || Mount Lemmon Survey || — || align=right | 3.6 km || 
|-id=622 bgcolor=#E9E9E9
| 443622 ||  || — || May 2, 2009 || Mount Lemmon || Mount Lemmon Survey || — || align=right | 2.5 km || 
|-id=623 bgcolor=#d6d6d6
| 443623 ||  || — || March 5, 2013 || Catalina || CSS || — || align=right | 4.3 km || 
|-id=624 bgcolor=#d6d6d6
| 443624 ||  || — || July 22, 2010 || WISE || WISE || EOS || align=right | 3.6 km || 
|-id=625 bgcolor=#d6d6d6
| 443625 ||  || — || January 10, 2007 || Kitt Peak || Spacewatch || — || align=right | 3.9 km || 
|-id=626 bgcolor=#E9E9E9
| 443626 ||  || — || May 30, 2006 || Mount Lemmon || Mount Lemmon Survey || — || align=right | 1.9 km || 
|-id=627 bgcolor=#d6d6d6
| 443627 ||  || — || January 20, 2012 || Mount Lemmon || Mount Lemmon Survey || — || align=right | 3.3 km || 
|-id=628 bgcolor=#d6d6d6
| 443628 ||  || — || April 14, 2008 || Kitt Peak || Spacewatch || — || align=right | 2.7 km || 
|-id=629 bgcolor=#d6d6d6
| 443629 ||  || — || April 11, 2008 || Kitt Peak || Spacewatch || — || align=right | 2.4 km || 
|-id=630 bgcolor=#d6d6d6
| 443630 ||  || — || October 31, 2010 || Mount Lemmon || Mount Lemmon Survey || — || align=right | 2.9 km || 
|-id=631 bgcolor=#d6d6d6
| 443631 ||  || — || January 27, 2000 || Kitt Peak || Spacewatch || HYG || align=right | 3.2 km || 
|-id=632 bgcolor=#fefefe
| 443632 ||  || — || March 14, 2010 || Kitt Peak || Spacewatch || V || align=right data-sort-value="0.74" | 740 m || 
|-id=633 bgcolor=#d6d6d6
| 443633 ||  || — || September 25, 2005 || Kitt Peak || Spacewatch || EOS || align=right | 2.0 km || 
|-id=634 bgcolor=#d6d6d6
| 443634 ||  || — || April 29, 2008 || Mount Lemmon || Mount Lemmon Survey || EOS || align=right | 2.1 km || 
|-id=635 bgcolor=#E9E9E9
| 443635 ||  || — || January 18, 2008 || Mount Lemmon || Mount Lemmon Survey || — || align=right | 1.8 km || 
|-id=636 bgcolor=#E9E9E9
| 443636 ||  || — || December 26, 2011 || Kitt Peak || Spacewatch || — || align=right | 2.1 km || 
|-id=637 bgcolor=#E9E9E9
| 443637 ||  || — || June 26, 2001 || Kitt Peak || Spacewatch || — || align=right | 3.0 km || 
|-id=638 bgcolor=#fefefe
| 443638 ||  || — || February 28, 2009 || Mount Lemmon || Mount Lemmon Survey || — || align=right | 1.0 km || 
|-id=639 bgcolor=#d6d6d6
| 443639 ||  || — || March 1, 2008 || Kitt Peak || Spacewatch || — || align=right | 3.0 km || 
|-id=640 bgcolor=#d6d6d6
| 443640 ||  || — || January 27, 2007 || Kitt Peak || Spacewatch || — || align=right | 3.6 km || 
|-id=641 bgcolor=#d6d6d6
| 443641 ||  || — || December 27, 2005 || Mount Lemmon || Mount Lemmon Survey || — || align=right | 3.6 km || 
|-id=642 bgcolor=#d6d6d6
| 443642 ||  || — || November 10, 2004 || Kitt Peak || Spacewatch || VER || align=right | 4.0 km || 
|-id=643 bgcolor=#d6d6d6
| 443643 ||  || — || September 11, 2010 || Kitt Peak || Spacewatch || — || align=right | 3.5 km || 
|-id=644 bgcolor=#d6d6d6
| 443644 ||  || — || August 18, 2009 || Kitt Peak || Spacewatch || — || align=right | 3.0 km || 
|-id=645 bgcolor=#d6d6d6
| 443645 ||  || — || February 23, 2007 || Kitt Peak || Spacewatch || — || align=right | 3.6 km || 
|-id=646 bgcolor=#d6d6d6
| 443646 ||  || — || June 27, 1998 || Kitt Peak || Spacewatch || — || align=right | 3.0 km || 
|-id=647 bgcolor=#d6d6d6
| 443647 ||  || — || September 15, 2009 || Kitt Peak || Spacewatch || LIX || align=right | 3.8 km || 
|-id=648 bgcolor=#d6d6d6
| 443648 ||  || — || March 25, 2007 || Mount Lemmon || Mount Lemmon Survey || — || align=right | 3.0 km || 
|-id=649 bgcolor=#d6d6d6
| 443649 ||  || — || September 16, 2010 || Kitt Peak || Spacewatch || TEL || align=right | 1.9 km || 
|-id=650 bgcolor=#d6d6d6
| 443650 ||  || — || September 18, 2003 || Kitt Peak || Spacewatch || — || align=right | 3.2 km || 
|-id=651 bgcolor=#fefefe
| 443651 ||  || — || October 26, 2009 || Mount Lemmon || Mount Lemmon Survey || V || align=right data-sort-value="0.85" | 850 m || 
|-id=652 bgcolor=#fefefe
| 443652 ||  || — || May 5, 2008 || Mount Lemmon || Mount Lemmon Survey || — || align=right data-sort-value="0.91" | 910 m || 
|-id=653 bgcolor=#fefefe
| 443653 ||  || — || March 13, 2007 || Mount Lemmon || Mount Lemmon Survey || — || align=right data-sort-value="0.99" | 990 m || 
|-id=654 bgcolor=#E9E9E9
| 443654 ||  || — || March 13, 2002 || Socorro || LINEAR || — || align=right | 1.5 km || 
|-id=655 bgcolor=#E9E9E9
| 443655 ||  || — || May 6, 2006 || Mount Lemmon || Mount Lemmon Survey || HOF || align=right | 2.8 km || 
|-id=656 bgcolor=#d6d6d6
| 443656 ||  || — || November 21, 1998 || Kitt Peak || Spacewatch || ULA7:4 || align=right | 6.1 km || 
|-id=657 bgcolor=#d6d6d6
| 443657 ||  || — || September 25, 2006 || Anderson Mesa || LONEOS || — || align=right | 4.2 km || 
|-id=658 bgcolor=#d6d6d6
| 443658 ||  || — || April 14, 2005 || Catalina || CSS || — || align=right | 4.6 km || 
|-id=659 bgcolor=#d6d6d6
| 443659 ||  || — || April 10, 2010 || Kitt Peak || Spacewatch || EOS || align=right | 2.3 km || 
|-id=660 bgcolor=#d6d6d6
| 443660 ||  || — || March 3, 2009 || Catalina || CSS || — || align=right | 4.0 km || 
|-id=661 bgcolor=#E9E9E9
| 443661 ||  || — || January 28, 2006 || Kitt Peak || Spacewatch || — || align=right | 1.7 km || 
|-id=662 bgcolor=#E9E9E9
| 443662 ||  || — || September 28, 2003 || Anderson Mesa || LONEOS || — || align=right | 2.2 km || 
|-id=663 bgcolor=#fefefe
| 443663 ||  || — || April 23, 2004 || Socorro || LINEAR || — || align=right | 1.2 km || 
|-id=664 bgcolor=#E9E9E9
| 443664 ||  || — || January 13, 2005 || Kitt Peak || Spacewatch || — || align=right | 3.4 km || 
|-id=665 bgcolor=#fefefe
| 443665 ||  || — || April 12, 1996 || Kitt Peak || Spacewatch || — || align=right | 1.0 km || 
|-id=666 bgcolor=#d6d6d6
| 443666 ||  || — || January 10, 2008 || Mount Lemmon || Mount Lemmon Survey || — || align=right | 5.0 km || 
|-id=667 bgcolor=#fefefe
| 443667 ||  || — || December 12, 1996 || Kitt Peak || Spacewatch || — || align=right data-sort-value="0.95" | 950 m || 
|-id=668 bgcolor=#FA8072
| 443668 ||  || — || June 3, 2005 || Kitt Peak || Spacewatch || — || align=right data-sort-value="0.86" | 860 m || 
|-id=669 bgcolor=#d6d6d6
| 443669 ||  || — || April 19, 1993 || Kitt Peak || Spacewatch || — || align=right | 3.6 km || 
|-id=670 bgcolor=#E9E9E9
| 443670 ||  || — || February 27, 2006 || Kitt Peak || Spacewatch || MAR || align=right | 1.1 km || 
|-id=671 bgcolor=#d6d6d6
| 443671 ||  || — || October 10, 2007 || Mount Lemmon || Mount Lemmon Survey || — || align=right | 2.7 km || 
|-id=672 bgcolor=#fefefe
| 443672 ||  || — || September 9, 2005 || Socorro || LINEAR || — || align=right | 1.1 km || 
|-id=673 bgcolor=#E9E9E9
| 443673 ||  || — || October 20, 2003 || Kitt Peak || Spacewatch || — || align=right | 2.8 km || 
|-id=674 bgcolor=#FA8072
| 443674 ||  || — || October 24, 2009 || Kitt Peak || Spacewatch || — || align=right data-sort-value="0.49" | 490 m || 
|-id=675 bgcolor=#fefefe
| 443675 ||  || — || May 7, 2008 || Mount Lemmon || Mount Lemmon Survey || — || align=right | 2.3 km || 
|-id=676 bgcolor=#d6d6d6
| 443676 ||  || — || October 14, 2007 || Mount Lemmon || Mount Lemmon Survey || EOS || align=right | 2.1 km || 
|-id=677 bgcolor=#E9E9E9
| 443677 ||  || — || September 22, 2003 || Kitt Peak || Spacewatch || — || align=right | 1.4 km || 
|-id=678 bgcolor=#d6d6d6
| 443678 ||  || — || May 17, 2010 || Mount Lemmon || Mount Lemmon Survey || — || align=right | 3.1 km || 
|-id=679 bgcolor=#E9E9E9
| 443679 ||  || — || May 30, 2006 || Kitt Peak || Spacewatch || — || align=right | 1.9 km || 
|-id=680 bgcolor=#E9E9E9
| 443680 ||  || — || August 10, 2007 || Kitt Peak || Spacewatch || — || align=right | 1.6 km || 
|-id=681 bgcolor=#E9E9E9
| 443681 ||  || — || March 16, 2010 || Mount Lemmon || Mount Lemmon Survey || — || align=right | 1.9 km || 
|-id=682 bgcolor=#d6d6d6
| 443682 ||  || — || September 30, 2006 || Catalina || CSS || EOS || align=right | 2.1 km || 
|-id=683 bgcolor=#E9E9E9
| 443683 ||  || — || January 7, 2006 || Mount Lemmon || Mount Lemmon Survey || — || align=right | 2.3 km || 
|-id=684 bgcolor=#d6d6d6
| 443684 ||  || — || August 2, 2010 || Socorro || LINEAR || — || align=right | 3.6 km || 
|-id=685 bgcolor=#fefefe
| 443685 ||  || — || October 29, 2005 || Mount Lemmon || Mount Lemmon Survey || — || align=right data-sort-value="0.79" | 790 m || 
|-id=686 bgcolor=#E9E9E9
| 443686 ||  || — || August 25, 1995 || Kitt Peak || Spacewatch || EUN || align=right | 1.3 km || 
|-id=687 bgcolor=#fefefe
| 443687 ||  || — || March 14, 2007 || Mount Lemmon || Mount Lemmon Survey || — || align=right data-sort-value="0.76" | 760 m || 
|-id=688 bgcolor=#fefefe
| 443688 ||  || — || April 22, 2007 || Kitt Peak || Spacewatch || SUL || align=right | 2.1 km || 
|-id=689 bgcolor=#fefefe
| 443689 ||  || — || November 3, 2005 || Kitt Peak || Spacewatch || — || align=right data-sort-value="0.86" | 860 m || 
|-id=690 bgcolor=#E9E9E9
| 443690 ||  || — || September 27, 2008 || Mount Lemmon || Mount Lemmon Survey || — || align=right | 2.1 km || 
|-id=691 bgcolor=#fefefe
| 443691 ||  || — || December 14, 2010 || Mount Lemmon || Mount Lemmon Survey || — || align=right data-sort-value="0.64" | 640 m || 
|-id=692 bgcolor=#d6d6d6
| 443692 ||  || — || March 3, 2009 || Catalina || CSS || — || align=right | 3.4 km || 
|-id=693 bgcolor=#d6d6d6
| 443693 ||  || — || February 16, 2004 || Kitt Peak || Spacewatch || — || align=right | 2.6 km || 
|-id=694 bgcolor=#fefefe
| 443694 ||  || — || April 24, 2008 || Mount Lemmon || Mount Lemmon Survey || (2076) || align=right data-sort-value="0.84" | 840 m || 
|-id=695 bgcolor=#d6d6d6
| 443695 ||  || — || April 9, 2003 || Kitt Peak || Spacewatch || — || align=right | 2.9 km || 
|-id=696 bgcolor=#E9E9E9
| 443696 ||  || — || December 29, 2008 || Kitt Peak || Spacewatch || — || align=right | 2.2 km || 
|-id=697 bgcolor=#E9E9E9
| 443697 ||  || — || December 17, 2009 || Kitt Peak || Spacewatch || — || align=right | 1.7 km || 
|-id=698 bgcolor=#E9E9E9
| 443698 ||  || — || November 20, 2000 || Anderson Mesa || LONEOS || — || align=right | 1.4 km || 
|-id=699 bgcolor=#E9E9E9
| 443699 ||  || — || September 21, 2003 || Kitt Peak || Spacewatch || EUN || align=right | 1.2 km || 
|-id=700 bgcolor=#fefefe
| 443700 ||  || — || October 31, 2005 || Catalina || CSS || — || align=right | 1.0 km || 
|}

443701–443800 

|-bgcolor=#E9E9E9
| 443701 ||  || — || February 27, 2006 || Kitt Peak || Spacewatch || (5) || align=right data-sort-value="0.89" | 890 m || 
|-id=702 bgcolor=#E9E9E9
| 443702 ||  || — || April 25, 2006 || Kitt Peak || Spacewatch || JUN || align=right | 1.0 km || 
|-id=703 bgcolor=#fefefe
| 443703 ||  || — || August 29, 2005 || Kitt Peak || Spacewatch || V || align=right data-sort-value="0.68" | 680 m || 
|-id=704 bgcolor=#d6d6d6
| 443704 ||  || — || February 2, 2008 || Mount Lemmon || Mount Lemmon Survey || — || align=right | 2.4 km || 
|-id=705 bgcolor=#E9E9E9
| 443705 ||  || — || May 23, 2006 || Kitt Peak || Spacewatch || — || align=right | 2.3 km || 
|-id=706 bgcolor=#d6d6d6
| 443706 ||  || — || February 22, 2009 || Catalina || CSS || — || align=right | 3.3 km || 
|-id=707 bgcolor=#E9E9E9
| 443707 ||  || — || January 8, 2000 || Kitt Peak || Spacewatch || — || align=right | 2.5 km || 
|-id=708 bgcolor=#d6d6d6
| 443708 ||  || — || March 28, 2009 || Catalina || CSS || — || align=right | 4.3 km || 
|-id=709 bgcolor=#fefefe
| 443709 ||  || — || October 18, 2009 || Mount Lemmon || Mount Lemmon Survey || — || align=right data-sort-value="0.59" | 590 m || 
|-id=710 bgcolor=#E9E9E9
| 443710 ||  || — || December 17, 1996 || Kitt Peak || Spacewatch || MAR || align=right | 1.5 km || 
|-id=711 bgcolor=#fefefe
| 443711 ||  || — || October 11, 2005 || Kitt Peak || Spacewatch || — || align=right data-sort-value="0.77" | 770 m || 
|-id=712 bgcolor=#fefefe
| 443712 ||  || — || September 28, 1994 || Kitt Peak || Spacewatch || — || align=right data-sort-value="0.75" | 750 m || 
|-id=713 bgcolor=#d6d6d6
| 443713 ||  || — || May 15, 2004 || Socorro || LINEAR || Tj (2.96) || align=right | 5.4 km || 
|-id=714 bgcolor=#fefefe
| 443714 ||  || — || October 17, 2006 || Mount Lemmon || Mount Lemmon Survey || — || align=right data-sort-value="0.93" | 930 m || 
|-id=715 bgcolor=#fefefe
| 443715 ||  || — || September 26, 2008 || Mount Lemmon || Mount Lemmon Survey || — || align=right data-sort-value="0.94" | 940 m || 
|-id=716 bgcolor=#fefefe
| 443716 ||  || — || April 20, 1996 || Kitt Peak || Spacewatch || — || align=right data-sort-value="0.81" | 810 m || 
|-id=717 bgcolor=#fefefe
| 443717 ||  || — || February 14, 2004 || Kitt Peak || Spacewatch || H || align=right data-sort-value="0.81" | 810 m || 
|-id=718 bgcolor=#fefefe
| 443718 ||  || — || September 20, 2003 || Anderson Mesa || LONEOS || — || align=right data-sort-value="0.87" | 870 m || 
|-id=719 bgcolor=#d6d6d6
| 443719 ||  || — || February 24, 2009 || Catalina || CSS || — || align=right | 3.6 km || 
|-id=720 bgcolor=#d6d6d6
| 443720 ||  || — || January 15, 2008 || Mount Lemmon || Mount Lemmon Survey || — || align=right | 2.8 km || 
|-id=721 bgcolor=#fefefe
| 443721 ||  || — || April 21, 2004 || Kitt Peak || Spacewatch || — || align=right data-sort-value="0.98" | 980 m || 
|-id=722 bgcolor=#fefefe
| 443722 ||  || — || April 2, 2011 || Kitt Peak || Spacewatch || MAS || align=right data-sort-value="0.78" | 780 m || 
|-id=723 bgcolor=#E9E9E9
| 443723 ||  || — || July 13, 1999 || Socorro || LINEAR || — || align=right | 1.8 km || 
|-id=724 bgcolor=#E9E9E9
| 443724 ||  || — || September 17, 2003 || Kitt Peak || Spacewatch || (5) || align=right data-sort-value="0.75" | 750 m || 
|-id=725 bgcolor=#fefefe
| 443725 ||  || — || January 10, 2007 || Mount Lemmon || Mount Lemmon Survey || — || align=right | 1.1 km || 
|-id=726 bgcolor=#d6d6d6
| 443726 ||  || — || December 18, 2007 || Mount Lemmon || Mount Lemmon Survey || (8737) || align=right | 3.8 km || 
|-id=727 bgcolor=#d6d6d6
| 443727 ||  || — || December 21, 2006 || Mount Lemmon || Mount Lemmon Survey || — || align=right | 4.1 km || 
|-id=728 bgcolor=#E9E9E9
| 443728 ||  || — || October 10, 2007 || Mount Lemmon || Mount Lemmon Survey || AEO || align=right | 1.0 km || 
|-id=729 bgcolor=#E9E9E9
| 443729 ||  || — || May 3, 2006 || Mount Lemmon || Mount Lemmon Survey || MAR || align=right | 1.3 km || 
|-id=730 bgcolor=#E9E9E9
| 443730 ||  || — || April 5, 2010 || Kitt Peak || Spacewatch || — || align=right | 1.2 km || 
|-id=731 bgcolor=#E9E9E9
| 443731 ||  || — || June 15, 2001 || Socorro || LINEAR || — || align=right | 2.5 km || 
|-id=732 bgcolor=#d6d6d6
| 443732 ||  || — || May 17, 2004 || Socorro || LINEAR || — || align=right | 4.0 km || 
|-id=733 bgcolor=#fefefe
| 443733 ||  || — || January 25, 2006 || Kitt Peak || Spacewatch || — || align=right | 1.2 km || 
|-id=734 bgcolor=#fefefe
| 443734 ||  || — || August 31, 2005 || Kitt Peak || Spacewatch || — || align=right data-sort-value="0.82" | 820 m || 
|-id=735 bgcolor=#d6d6d6
| 443735 ||  || — || March 10, 2007 || Mount Lemmon || Mount Lemmon Survey || Tj (2.93) || align=right | 5.1 km || 
|-id=736 bgcolor=#d6d6d6
| 443736 ||  || — || April 30, 2004 || Kitt Peak || Spacewatch || — || align=right | 4.6 km || 
|-id=737 bgcolor=#E9E9E9
| 443737 ||  || — || August 28, 2011 || Siding Spring || SSS || — || align=right | 3.2 km || 
|-id=738 bgcolor=#d6d6d6
| 443738 ||  || — || January 9, 2007 || Mount Lemmon || Mount Lemmon Survey || — || align=right | 2.9 km || 
|-id=739 bgcolor=#fefefe
| 443739 ||  || — || January 12, 2010 || Mount Lemmon || Mount Lemmon Survey || V || align=right data-sort-value="0.68" | 680 m || 
|-id=740 bgcolor=#E9E9E9
| 443740 ||  || — || February 1, 1995 || Kitt Peak || Spacewatch || — || align=right | 2.3 km || 
|-id=741 bgcolor=#d6d6d6
| 443741 ||  || — || May 23, 1999 || Kitt Peak || Spacewatch || — || align=right | 2.4 km || 
|-id=742 bgcolor=#d6d6d6
| 443742 ||  || — || June 24, 2010 || WISE || WISE || — || align=right | 5.4 km || 
|-id=743 bgcolor=#d6d6d6
| 443743 ||  || — || February 17, 2004 || Socorro || LINEAR || — || align=right | 3.8 km || 
|-id=744 bgcolor=#d6d6d6
| 443744 ||  || — || November 21, 2006 || Mount Lemmon || Mount Lemmon Survey || — || align=right | 3.5 km || 
|-id=745 bgcolor=#E9E9E9
| 443745 ||  || — || January 15, 2010 || WISE || WISE || — || align=right | 2.7 km || 
|-id=746 bgcolor=#d6d6d6
| 443746 ||  || — || May 15, 2010 || WISE || WISE || — || align=right | 3.2 km || 
|-id=747 bgcolor=#E9E9E9
| 443747 ||  || — || November 19, 2008 || Catalina || CSS || — || align=right | 1.8 km || 
|-id=748 bgcolor=#d6d6d6
| 443748 ||  || — || May 1, 2009 || Mount Lemmon || Mount Lemmon Survey || — || align=right | 3.4 km || 
|-id=749 bgcolor=#fefefe
| 443749 ||  || — || June 27, 2008 || Siding Spring || SSS || — || align=right data-sort-value="0.90" | 900 m || 
|-id=750 bgcolor=#d6d6d6
| 443750 ||  || — || March 2, 2009 || Mount Lemmon || Mount Lemmon Survey || — || align=right | 3.9 km || 
|-id=751 bgcolor=#d6d6d6
| 443751 ||  || — || August 31, 2005 || Kitt Peak || Spacewatch || — || align=right | 2.8 km || 
|-id=752 bgcolor=#E9E9E9
| 443752 ||  || — || March 9, 2005 || Kitt Peak || Spacewatch || WIT || align=right | 1.0 km || 
|-id=753 bgcolor=#d6d6d6
| 443753 ||  || — || September 10, 2010 || Mount Lemmon || Mount Lemmon Survey || VER || align=right | 2.6 km || 
|-id=754 bgcolor=#d6d6d6
| 443754 ||  || — || June 18, 2010 || WISE || WISE || — || align=right | 4.7 km || 
|-id=755 bgcolor=#E9E9E9
| 443755 ||  || — || November 29, 2003 || Kitt Peak || Spacewatch || — || align=right | 1.4 km || 
|-id=756 bgcolor=#d6d6d6
| 443756 ||  || — || July 8, 2010 || Kitt Peak || Spacewatch || — || align=right | 4.5 km || 
|-id=757 bgcolor=#d6d6d6
| 443757 ||  || — || September 30, 2005 || Catalina || CSS || — || align=right | 4.9 km || 
|-id=758 bgcolor=#E9E9E9
| 443758 ||  || — || September 16, 2003 || Kitt Peak || Spacewatch || — || align=right | 1.2 km || 
|-id=759 bgcolor=#d6d6d6
| 443759 ||  || — || August 31, 2005 || Kitt Peak || Spacewatch || — || align=right | 2.2 km || 
|-id=760 bgcolor=#fefefe
| 443760 ||  || — || September 15, 2012 || Catalina || CSS || — || align=right data-sort-value="0.87" | 870 m || 
|-id=761 bgcolor=#d6d6d6
| 443761 ||  || — || February 14, 1999 || Kitt Peak || Spacewatch || — || align=right | 2.4 km || 
|-id=762 bgcolor=#E9E9E9
| 443762 ||  || — || March 4, 2005 || Mount Lemmon || Mount Lemmon Survey || AGN || align=right | 1.3 km || 
|-id=763 bgcolor=#fefefe
| 443763 ||  || — || October 26, 2005 || Kitt Peak || Spacewatch || — || align=right | 1.2 km || 
|-id=764 bgcolor=#E9E9E9
| 443764 ||  || — || October 14, 2012 || Mount Lemmon || Mount Lemmon Survey || EUN || align=right | 1.2 km || 
|-id=765 bgcolor=#d6d6d6
| 443765 ||  || — || December 13, 2006 || Mount Lemmon || Mount Lemmon Survey || — || align=right | 4.4 km || 
|-id=766 bgcolor=#E9E9E9
| 443766 ||  || — || December 14, 1995 || Kitt Peak || Spacewatch || — || align=right | 1.7 km || 
|-id=767 bgcolor=#E9E9E9
| 443767 ||  || — || May 24, 2006 || Kitt Peak || Spacewatch || MAR || align=right | 1.2 km || 
|-id=768 bgcolor=#d6d6d6
| 443768 ||  || — || December 18, 2001 || Socorro || LINEAR || — || align=right | 3.0 km || 
|-id=769 bgcolor=#E9E9E9
| 443769 ||  || — || June 22, 2010 || WISE || WISE || — || align=right | 3.1 km || 
|-id=770 bgcolor=#fefefe
| 443770 ||  || — || February 25, 2011 || Kitt Peak || Spacewatch || — || align=right data-sort-value="0.74" | 740 m || 
|-id=771 bgcolor=#d6d6d6
| 443771 ||  || — || January 6, 2013 || Kitt Peak || Spacewatch || — || align=right | 3.7 km || 
|-id=772 bgcolor=#E9E9E9
| 443772 ||  || — || September 14, 2007 || Catalina || CSS || — || align=right | 1.0 km || 
|-id=773 bgcolor=#d6d6d6
| 443773 ||  || — || August 16, 2004 || Siding Spring || SSS || — || align=right | 5.7 km || 
|-id=774 bgcolor=#d6d6d6
| 443774 ||  || — || June 14, 2010 || WISE || WISE || — || align=right | 2.8 km || 
|-id=775 bgcolor=#d6d6d6
| 443775 ||  || — || May 19, 2004 || Campo Imperatore || CINEOS || — || align=right | 3.8 km || 
|-id=776 bgcolor=#d6d6d6
| 443776 ||  || — || March 18, 2004 || Kitt Peak || Spacewatch || — || align=right | 3.7 km || 
|-id=777 bgcolor=#E9E9E9
| 443777 ||  || — || June 23, 2007 || Kitt Peak || Spacewatch || — || align=right | 1.0 km || 
|-id=778 bgcolor=#d6d6d6
| 443778 ||  || — || August 21, 2004 || Siding Spring || SSS || — || align=right | 4.9 km || 
|-id=779 bgcolor=#d6d6d6
| 443779 ||  || — || September 29, 2005 || Kitt Peak || Spacewatch || — || align=right | 2.3 km || 
|-id=780 bgcolor=#fefefe
| 443780 ||  || — || November 28, 1994 || Kitt Peak || Spacewatch || V || align=right data-sort-value="0.62" | 620 m || 
|-id=781 bgcolor=#d6d6d6
| 443781 ||  || — || May 26, 2009 || Mount Lemmon || Mount Lemmon Survey || — || align=right | 3.0 km || 
|-id=782 bgcolor=#d6d6d6
| 443782 ||  || — || March 16, 2009 || Mount Lemmon || Mount Lemmon Survey || — || align=right | 2.1 km || 
|-id=783 bgcolor=#d6d6d6
| 443783 ||  || — || November 20, 2005 || Catalina || CSS || — || align=right | 5.4 km || 
|-id=784 bgcolor=#d6d6d6
| 443784 ||  || — || May 24, 2010 || WISE || WISE || — || align=right | 3.5 km || 
|-id=785 bgcolor=#d6d6d6
| 443785 ||  || — || June 24, 2010 || WISE || WISE || — || align=right | 4.9 km || 
|-id=786 bgcolor=#d6d6d6
| 443786 ||  || — || April 4, 2008 || Mount Lemmon || Mount Lemmon Survey || — || align=right | 3.1 km || 
|-id=787 bgcolor=#d6d6d6
| 443787 ||  || — || December 10, 2001 || Kitt Peak || Spacewatch || — || align=right | 5.3 km || 
|-id=788 bgcolor=#E9E9E9
| 443788 ||  || — || November 3, 2008 || Mount Lemmon || Mount Lemmon Survey || — || align=right | 2.0 km || 
|-id=789 bgcolor=#fefefe
| 443789 ||  || — || May 29, 2000 || Kitt Peak || Spacewatch || — || align=right data-sort-value="0.71" | 710 m || 
|-id=790 bgcolor=#d6d6d6
| 443790 ||  || — || July 2, 2005 || Kitt Peak || Spacewatch || — || align=right | 3.6 km || 
|-id=791 bgcolor=#d6d6d6
| 443791 ||  || — || February 27, 2009 || Kitt Peak || Spacewatch || — || align=right | 2.4 km || 
|-id=792 bgcolor=#fefefe
| 443792 ||  || — || August 9, 2004 || Anderson Mesa || LONEOS || — || align=right data-sort-value="0.73" | 730 m || 
|-id=793 bgcolor=#d6d6d6
| 443793 ||  || — || May 23, 2010 || WISE || WISE || — || align=right | 4.2 km || 
|-id=794 bgcolor=#E9E9E9
| 443794 ||  || — || October 22, 2008 || Mount Lemmon || Mount Lemmon Survey || — || align=right | 2.3 km || 
|-id=795 bgcolor=#d6d6d6
| 443795 || 1917 T-3 || — || October 17, 1977 || Palomar || PLS || — || align=right | 2.1 km || 
|-id=796 bgcolor=#E9E9E9
| 443796 || 1960 SW || — || September 24, 1960 || Palomar || L. D. Schmadel, R. M. Stoss || — || align=right | 1.5 km || 
|-id=797 bgcolor=#E9E9E9
| 443797 ||  || — || September 29, 1994 || Kitt Peak || Spacewatch || — || align=right | 1.4 km || 
|-id=798 bgcolor=#d6d6d6
| 443798 ||  || — || February 1, 1995 || Kitt Peak || Spacewatch || LIX || align=right | 2.6 km || 
|-id=799 bgcolor=#d6d6d6
| 443799 ||  || — || October 19, 1995 || Kitt Peak || Spacewatch || — || align=right | 2.2 km || 
|-id=800 bgcolor=#fefefe
| 443800 ||  || — || November 14, 1995 || Kitt Peak || Spacewatch || — || align=right data-sort-value="0.64" | 640 m || 
|}

443801–443900 

|-bgcolor=#E9E9E9
| 443801 ||  || — || June 11, 1996 || Kitt Peak || Spacewatch || JUN || align=right | 1.1 km || 
|-id=802 bgcolor=#FA8072
| 443802 ||  || — || September 6, 1997 || Caussols || ODAS || — || align=right data-sort-value="0.59" | 590 m || 
|-id=803 bgcolor=#fefefe
| 443803 ||  || — || September 23, 1997 || Kitt Peak || Spacewatch || — || align=right data-sort-value="0.82" | 820 m || 
|-id=804 bgcolor=#fefefe
| 443804 ||  || — || September 29, 1997 || Kitt Peak || Spacewatch || — || align=right | 1.00 km || 
|-id=805 bgcolor=#d6d6d6
| 443805 ||  || — || November 20, 1997 || Kitt Peak || Spacewatch || 7:4* || align=right | 2.8 km || 
|-id=806 bgcolor=#FFC2E0
| 443806 ||  || — || March 22, 1998 || Kitt Peak || Spacewatch || APOPHAcritical || align=right data-sort-value="0.29" | 290 m || 
|-id=807 bgcolor=#fefefe
| 443807 ||  || — || March 20, 1998 || Socorro || LINEAR || — || align=right | 1.5 km || 
|-id=808 bgcolor=#FA8072
| 443808 ||  || — || August 17, 1998 || Socorro || LINEAR || — || align=right | 2.1 km || 
|-id=809 bgcolor=#E9E9E9
| 443809 ||  || — || October 11, 1998 || Anderson Mesa || LONEOS || — || align=right | 1.7 km || 
|-id=810 bgcolor=#E9E9E9
| 443810 ||  || — || November 16, 1998 || Kitt Peak || Spacewatch || — || align=right | 1.3 km || 
|-id=811 bgcolor=#E9E9E9
| 443811 ||  || — || December 8, 1998 || Kitt Peak || Spacewatch || — || align=right | 1.2 km || 
|-id=812 bgcolor=#d6d6d6
| 443812 ||  || — || September 8, 1999 || Socorro || LINEAR || Tj (2.97) || align=right | 2.8 km || 
|-id=813 bgcolor=#d6d6d6
| 443813 ||  || — || October 9, 1999 || Kitt Peak || Spacewatch || EOS || align=right | 3.1 km || 
|-id=814 bgcolor=#E9E9E9
| 443814 ||  || — || October 12, 1999 || Kitt Peak || Spacewatch || — || align=right data-sort-value="0.82" | 820 m || 
|-id=815 bgcolor=#FA8072
| 443815 ||  || — || October 6, 1999 || Kitt Peak || Spacewatch || — || align=right data-sort-value="0.56" | 560 m || 
|-id=816 bgcolor=#d6d6d6
| 443816 ||  || — || October 4, 1999 || Socorro || LINEAR || 3:2 || align=right | 8.3 km || 
|-id=817 bgcolor=#E9E9E9
| 443817 ||  || — || October 15, 1999 || Socorro || LINEAR || — || align=right | 2.6 km || 
|-id=818 bgcolor=#d6d6d6
| 443818 ||  || — || October 2, 1999 || Kitt Peak || Spacewatch || THM || align=right | 1.6 km || 
|-id=819 bgcolor=#FA8072
| 443819 ||  || — || October 8, 1999 || Socorro || LINEAR || H || align=right data-sort-value="0.83" | 830 m || 
|-id=820 bgcolor=#d6d6d6
| 443820 ||  || — || October 13, 1999 || Kitt Peak || Spacewatch || EOS || align=right | 1.8 km || 
|-id=821 bgcolor=#d6d6d6
| 443821 ||  || — || October 6, 1999 || Socorro || LINEAR || — || align=right | 2.8 km || 
|-id=822 bgcolor=#d6d6d6
| 443822 ||  || — || November 9, 1999 || Socorro || LINEAR || — || align=right | 3.5 km || 
|-id=823 bgcolor=#E9E9E9
| 443823 ||  || — || November 14, 1999 || Kitt Peak || Spacewatch || — || align=right data-sort-value="0.81" | 810 m || 
|-id=824 bgcolor=#d6d6d6
| 443824 ||  || — || November 28, 1999 || Kitt Peak || Spacewatch || — || align=right | 2.5 km || 
|-id=825 bgcolor=#E9E9E9
| 443825 ||  || — || November 30, 1999 || Kitt Peak || Spacewatch || — || align=right data-sort-value="0.75" | 750 m || 
|-id=826 bgcolor=#E9E9E9
| 443826 ||  || — || December 12, 1999 || Socorro || LINEAR || — || align=right | 2.2 km || 
|-id=827 bgcolor=#E9E9E9
| 443827 ||  || — || January 8, 2000 || Socorro || LINEAR || — || align=right | 1.5 km || 
|-id=828 bgcolor=#E9E9E9
| 443828 ||  || — || February 2, 2000 || Kitt Peak || Spacewatch || MIS || align=right | 2.1 km || 
|-id=829 bgcolor=#E9E9E9
| 443829 ||  || — || January 6, 2000 || Kitt Peak || Spacewatch || — || align=right | 2.6 km || 
|-id=830 bgcolor=#fefefe
| 443830 ||  || — || April 7, 2000 || Kitt Peak || Spacewatch || — || align=right data-sort-value="0.78" | 780 m || 
|-id=831 bgcolor=#FA8072
| 443831 ||  || — || April 28, 2000 || Anderson Mesa || LONEOS || — || align=right data-sort-value="0.86" | 860 m || 
|-id=832 bgcolor=#FA8072
| 443832 ||  || — || July 29, 2000 || Anderson Mesa || LONEOS || — || align=right data-sort-value="0.76" | 760 m || 
|-id=833 bgcolor=#fefefe
| 443833 ||  || — || August 24, 2000 || Socorro || LINEAR || — || align=right data-sort-value="0.83" | 830 m || 
|-id=834 bgcolor=#fefefe
| 443834 ||  || — || September 25, 2000 || Anderson Mesa || LONEOS || — || align=right | 1.1 km || 
|-id=835 bgcolor=#fefefe
| 443835 ||  || — || September 28, 2000 || Socorro || LINEAR || — || align=right | 1.0 km || 
|-id=836 bgcolor=#fefefe
| 443836 ||  || — || September 28, 2000 || Socorro || LINEAR || — || align=right | 1.2 km || 
|-id=837 bgcolor=#FFC2E0
| 443837 ||  || — || October 1, 2000 || Socorro || LINEAR || AMO || align=right data-sort-value="0.25" | 250 m || 
|-id=838 bgcolor=#FA8072
| 443838 ||  || — || October 24, 2000 || Socorro || LINEAR || H || align=right data-sort-value="0.73" | 730 m || 
|-id=839 bgcolor=#fefefe
| 443839 ||  || — || November 23, 2000 || Drebach || J. Kandler || — || align=right data-sort-value="0.96" | 960 m || 
|-id=840 bgcolor=#d6d6d6
| 443840 ||  || — || November 20, 2000 || Socorro || LINEAR || — || align=right | 2.3 km || 
|-id=841 bgcolor=#fefefe
| 443841 ||  || — || October 25, 2000 || Socorro || LINEAR || — || align=right | 1.1 km || 
|-id=842 bgcolor=#FA8072
| 443842 ||  || — || March 19, 2001 || Socorro || LINEAR || — || align=right | 1.8 km || 
|-id=843 bgcolor=#C2E0FF
| 443843 ||  || — || March 26, 2001 || Kitt Peak || M. W. Buie || cubewano (hot)critical || align=right | 156 km || 
|-id=844 bgcolor=#FA8072
| 443844 ||  || — || April 25, 2001 || Anderson Mesa || LONEOS || — || align=right data-sort-value="0.54" | 540 m || 
|-id=845 bgcolor=#fefefe
| 443845 ||  || — || July 21, 2001 || Kitt Peak || Spacewatch || — || align=right data-sort-value="0.67" | 670 m || 
|-id=846 bgcolor=#E9E9E9
| 443846 ||  || — || July 22, 2001 || Palomar || NEAT || — || align=right | 2.0 km || 
|-id=847 bgcolor=#fefefe
| 443847 ||  || — || July 29, 2001 || Palomar || NEAT || — || align=right data-sort-value="0.75" | 750 m || 
|-id=848 bgcolor=#E9E9E9
| 443848 ||  || — || August 10, 2001 || Palomar || NEAT || — || align=right | 2.5 km || 
|-id=849 bgcolor=#fefefe
| 443849 ||  || — || August 24, 2001 || Socorro || LINEAR || critical || align=right data-sort-value="0.68" | 680 m || 
|-id=850 bgcolor=#E9E9E9
| 443850 ||  || — || August 23, 2001 || Anderson Mesa || LONEOS || — || align=right | 1.6 km || 
|-id=851 bgcolor=#fefefe
| 443851 ||  || — || August 25, 2001 || Socorro || LINEAR || — || align=right | 1.2 km || 
|-id=852 bgcolor=#fefefe
| 443852 ||  || — || September 9, 2001 || Socorro || LINEAR || — || align=right data-sort-value="0.86" | 860 m || 
|-id=853 bgcolor=#fefefe
| 443853 ||  || — || September 11, 2001 || Socorro || LINEAR || — || align=right data-sort-value="0.85" | 850 m || 
|-id=854 bgcolor=#FA8072
| 443854 ||  || — || September 12, 2001 || Socorro || LINEAR || — || align=right data-sort-value="0.79" | 790 m || 
|-id=855 bgcolor=#fefefe
| 443855 ||  || — || September 12, 2001 || Socorro || LINEAR || — || align=right data-sort-value="0.83" | 830 m || 
|-id=856 bgcolor=#E9E9E9
| 443856 ||  || — || September 11, 2001 || Anderson Mesa || LONEOS || — || align=right | 3.1 km || 
|-id=857 bgcolor=#fefefe
| 443857 ||  || — || September 18, 2001 || Prescott || P. G. Comba || — || align=right data-sort-value="0.82" | 820 m || 
|-id=858 bgcolor=#fefefe
| 443858 ||  || — || September 16, 2001 || Socorro || LINEAR || — || align=right data-sort-value="0.71" | 710 m || 
|-id=859 bgcolor=#E9E9E9
| 443859 ||  || — || September 17, 2001 || Socorro || LINEAR || DOR || align=right | 2.9 km || 
|-id=860 bgcolor=#fefefe
| 443860 ||  || — || September 20, 2001 || Socorro || LINEAR || — || align=right data-sort-value="0.67" | 670 m || 
|-id=861 bgcolor=#E9E9E9
| 443861 ||  || — || September 19, 2001 || Socorro || LINEAR || — || align=right | 2.7 km || 
|-id=862 bgcolor=#fefefe
| 443862 ||  || — || September 19, 2001 || Socorro || LINEAR || V || align=right data-sort-value="0.55" | 550 m || 
|-id=863 bgcolor=#fefefe
| 443863 ||  || — || September 19, 2001 || Socorro || LINEAR || — || align=right data-sort-value="0.66" | 660 m || 
|-id=864 bgcolor=#d6d6d6
| 443864 ||  || — || September 19, 2001 || Socorro || LINEAR || — || align=right | 2.4 km || 
|-id=865 bgcolor=#E9E9E9
| 443865 ||  || — || September 21, 2001 || Anderson Mesa || LONEOS || — || align=right | 3.6 km || 
|-id=866 bgcolor=#fefefe
| 443866 ||  || — || September 16, 2001 || Socorro || LINEAR || — || align=right data-sort-value="0.52" | 520 m || 
|-id=867 bgcolor=#E9E9E9
| 443867 ||  || — || September 20, 2001 || Socorro || LINEAR || — || align=right | 2.7 km || 
|-id=868 bgcolor=#fefefe
| 443868 ||  || — || September 21, 2001 || Anderson Mesa || LONEOS || — || align=right data-sort-value="0.65" | 650 m || 
|-id=869 bgcolor=#fefefe
| 443869 ||  || — || October 14, 2001 || Socorro || LINEAR || — || align=right data-sort-value="0.86" | 860 m || 
|-id=870 bgcolor=#E9E9E9
| 443870 ||  || — || September 20, 2001 || Socorro || LINEAR ||  || align=right | 3.5 km || 
|-id=871 bgcolor=#E9E9E9
| 443871 ||  || — || September 19, 2001 || Kitt Peak || Spacewatch || — || align=right | 2.2 km || 
|-id=872 bgcolor=#E9E9E9
| 443872 ||  || — || September 20, 2001 || Socorro || LINEAR || DOR || align=right | 2.9 km || 
|-id=873 bgcolor=#fefefe
| 443873 ||  || — || October 14, 2001 || Socorro || LINEAR || — || align=right data-sort-value="0.94" | 940 m || 
|-id=874 bgcolor=#fefefe
| 443874 ||  || — || October 10, 2001 || Palomar || NEAT || — || align=right data-sort-value="0.73" | 730 m || 
|-id=875 bgcolor=#fefefe
| 443875 ||  || — || October 10, 2001 || Palomar || NEAT || — || align=right data-sort-value="0.71" | 710 m || 
|-id=876 bgcolor=#E9E9E9
| 443876 ||  || — || October 11, 2001 || Palomar || NEAT || — || align=right | 2.3 km || 
|-id=877 bgcolor=#fefefe
| 443877 ||  || — || October 14, 2001 || Socorro || LINEAR || — || align=right data-sort-value="0.75" | 750 m || 
|-id=878 bgcolor=#fefefe
| 443878 ||  || — || October 13, 2001 || Anderson Mesa || LONEOS || — || align=right data-sort-value="0.71" | 710 m || 
|-id=879 bgcolor=#fefefe
| 443879 ||  || — || October 10, 2001 || Palomar || NEAT || — || align=right data-sort-value="0.90" | 900 m || 
|-id=880 bgcolor=#FFC2E0
| 443880 ||  || — || October 25, 2001 || Socorro || LINEAR || APOPHAcritical || align=right data-sort-value="0.23" | 230 m || 
|-id=881 bgcolor=#fefefe
| 443881 ||  || — || October 17, 2001 || Socorro || LINEAR || — || align=right data-sort-value="0.79" | 790 m || 
|-id=882 bgcolor=#fefefe
| 443882 ||  || — || October 21, 2001 || Kitt Peak || Spacewatch || — || align=right data-sort-value="0.86" | 860 m || 
|-id=883 bgcolor=#E9E9E9
| 443883 ||  || — || October 20, 2001 || Socorro || LINEAR || critical || align=right | 1.7 km || 
|-id=884 bgcolor=#fefefe
| 443884 ||  || — || October 21, 2001 || Socorro || LINEAR || — || align=right data-sort-value="0.96" | 960 m || 
|-id=885 bgcolor=#FA8072
| 443885 ||  || — || October 22, 2001 || Socorro || LINEAR || — || align=right data-sort-value="0.94" | 940 m || 
|-id=886 bgcolor=#fefefe
| 443886 ||  || — || October 16, 2001 || Palomar || NEAT || — || align=right data-sort-value="0.60" | 600 m || 
|-id=887 bgcolor=#fefefe
| 443887 ||  || — || November 9, 2001 || Socorro || LINEAR || — || align=right data-sort-value="0.82" | 820 m || 
|-id=888 bgcolor=#fefefe
| 443888 ||  || — || November 9, 2001 || Socorro || LINEAR || — || align=right data-sort-value="0.81" | 810 m || 
|-id=889 bgcolor=#fefefe
| 443889 ||  || — || November 12, 2001 || Socorro || LINEAR || — || align=right data-sort-value="0.47" | 470 m || 
|-id=890 bgcolor=#fefefe
| 443890 ||  || — || November 11, 2001 || Kitt Peak || Spacewatch || NYS || align=right data-sort-value="0.53" | 530 m || 
|-id=891 bgcolor=#fefefe
| 443891 ||  || — || November 19, 2001 || Socorro || LINEAR || — || align=right data-sort-value="0.83" | 830 m || 
|-id=892 bgcolor=#FA8072
| 443892 ||  || — || December 9, 2001 || Socorro || LINEAR || — || align=right data-sort-value="0.90" | 900 m || 
|-id=893 bgcolor=#fefefe
| 443893 ||  || — || December 9, 2001 || Socorro || LINEAR || — || align=right | 1.1 km || 
|-id=894 bgcolor=#fefefe
| 443894 ||  || — || December 14, 2001 || Kitt Peak || Spacewatch || — || align=right data-sort-value="0.71" | 710 m || 
|-id=895 bgcolor=#d6d6d6
| 443895 ||  || — || December 14, 2001 || Socorro || LINEAR || 3:2 || align=right | 4.5 km || 
|-id=896 bgcolor=#fefefe
| 443896 ||  || — || December 15, 2001 || Socorro || LINEAR || — || align=right data-sort-value="0.82" | 820 m || 
|-id=897 bgcolor=#fefefe
| 443897 ||  || — || December 18, 2001 || Socorro || LINEAR || — || align=right data-sort-value="0.66" | 660 m || 
|-id=898 bgcolor=#fefefe
| 443898 ||  || — || December 17, 2001 || Kitt Peak || Spacewatch || — || align=right data-sort-value="0.76" | 760 m || 
|-id=899 bgcolor=#d6d6d6
| 443899 ||  || — || January 6, 2002 || Socorro || LINEAR || — || align=right | 4.1 km || 
|-id=900 bgcolor=#fefefe
| 443900 ||  || — || February 8, 2002 || Desert Eagle || W. K. Y. Yeung || — || align=right data-sort-value="0.86" | 860 m || 
|}

443901–444000 

|-bgcolor=#d6d6d6
| 443901 ||  || — || February 7, 2002 || Socorro || LINEAR || — || align=right | 3.5 km || 
|-id=902 bgcolor=#fefefe
| 443902 ||  || — || February 12, 2002 || Kitt Peak || Spacewatch || — || align=right data-sort-value="0.65" | 650 m || 
|-id=903 bgcolor=#d6d6d6
| 443903 ||  || — || February 11, 2002 || Socorro || LINEAR || — || align=right | 3.9 km || 
|-id=904 bgcolor=#fefefe
| 443904 ||  || — || February 16, 2002 || Palomar || NEAT || — || align=right data-sort-value="0.77" | 770 m || 
|-id=905 bgcolor=#fefefe
| 443905 ||  || — || March 5, 2002 || Kitt Peak || Spacewatch || MAS || align=right data-sort-value="0.62" | 620 m || 
|-id=906 bgcolor=#d6d6d6
| 443906 ||  || — || March 9, 2002 || Socorro || LINEAR || — || align=right | 5.3 km || 
|-id=907 bgcolor=#d6d6d6
| 443907 ||  || — || March 13, 2002 || Socorro || LINEAR || Tj (2.99) || align=right | 3.8 km || 
|-id=908 bgcolor=#d6d6d6
| 443908 ||  || — || March 16, 2002 || Kitt Peak || Spacewatch || — || align=right | 3.6 km || 
|-id=909 bgcolor=#fefefe
| 443909 ||  || — || April 9, 2002 || Kitt Peak || Spacewatch || — || align=right | 1.0 km || 
|-id=910 bgcolor=#d6d6d6
| 443910 ||  || — || April 10, 2002 || Socorro || LINEAR || — || align=right | 4.0 km || 
|-id=911 bgcolor=#d6d6d6
| 443911 ||  || — || April 4, 2002 || Kitt Peak || Spacewatch || — || align=right | 3.6 km || 
|-id=912 bgcolor=#E9E9E9
| 443912 ||  || — || July 9, 2002 || Socorro || LINEAR || — || align=right | 1.4 km || 
|-id=913 bgcolor=#E9E9E9
| 443913 ||  || — || August 2, 2002 || Campo Imperatore || CINEOS || — || align=right | 1.4 km || 
|-id=914 bgcolor=#E9E9E9
| 443914 ||  || — || August 12, 2002 || Socorro || LINEAR || — || align=right | 1.6 km || 
|-id=915 bgcolor=#E9E9E9
| 443915 ||  || — || August 5, 2002 || Palomar || NEAT || — || align=right | 2.8 km || 
|-id=916 bgcolor=#fefefe
| 443916 ||  || — || August 8, 2002 || Palomar || S. F. Hönig || — || align=right data-sort-value="0.79" | 790 m || 
|-id=917 bgcolor=#E9E9E9
| 443917 ||  || — || August 4, 2002 || Socorro || LINEAR || JUN || align=right | 1.1 km || 
|-id=918 bgcolor=#E9E9E9
| 443918 ||  || — || August 8, 2002 || Palomar || NEAT || — || align=right data-sort-value="0.98" | 980 m || 
|-id=919 bgcolor=#FA8072
| 443919 ||  || — || August 30, 2002 || Palomar || NEAT || — || align=right data-sort-value="0.59" | 590 m || 
|-id=920 bgcolor=#E9E9E9
| 443920 ||  || — || August 30, 2002 || Kitt Peak || Spacewatch || — || align=right | 1.5 km || 
|-id=921 bgcolor=#E9E9E9
| 443921 ||  || — || August 29, 2002 || Palomar || NEAT || — || align=right | 2.3 km || 
|-id=922 bgcolor=#E9E9E9
| 443922 ||  || — || August 17, 2002 || Palomar || NEAT || — || align=right | 1.6 km || 
|-id=923 bgcolor=#FFC2E0
| 443923 ||  || — || September 5, 2002 || Socorro || LINEAR || AMO +1kmslow || align=right | 3.3 km || 
|-id=924 bgcolor=#E9E9E9
| 443924 ||  || — || September 4, 2002 || Anderson Mesa || LONEOS || — || align=right | 1.5 km || 
|-id=925 bgcolor=#E9E9E9
| 443925 ||  || — || September 5, 2002 || Socorro || LINEAR || — || align=right | 1.7 km || 
|-id=926 bgcolor=#E9E9E9
| 443926 ||  || — || September 13, 2002 || Palomar || NEAT || — || align=right | 1.5 km || 
|-id=927 bgcolor=#E9E9E9
| 443927 ||  || — || September 29, 2002 || Haleakala || NEAT || — || align=right | 1.8 km || 
|-id=928 bgcolor=#E9E9E9
| 443928 ||  || — || September 30, 2002 || Socorro || LINEAR || — || align=right | 1.5 km || 
|-id=929 bgcolor=#E9E9E9
| 443929 ||  || — || September 30, 2002 || Haleakala || NEAT || — || align=right | 2.0 km || 
|-id=930 bgcolor=#fefefe
| 443930 ||  || — || September 30, 2002 || Socorro || LINEAR || — || align=right data-sort-value="0.73" | 730 m || 
|-id=931 bgcolor=#fefefe
| 443931 ||  || — || October 2, 2002 || Socorro || LINEAR || — || align=right data-sort-value="0.60" | 600 m || 
|-id=932 bgcolor=#fefefe
| 443932 ||  || — || October 4, 2002 || Anderson Mesa || LONEOS || — || align=right data-sort-value="0.75" | 750 m || 
|-id=933 bgcolor=#E9E9E9
| 443933 ||  || — || August 13, 2002 || Socorro || LINEAR || — || align=right | 1.7 km || 
|-id=934 bgcolor=#E9E9E9
| 443934 ||  || — || October 4, 2002 || Socorro || LINEAR || — || align=right | 1.7 km || 
|-id=935 bgcolor=#E9E9E9
| 443935 ||  || — || October 6, 2002 || Socorro || LINEAR || — || align=right | 2.2 km || 
|-id=936 bgcolor=#E9E9E9
| 443936 ||  || — || October 15, 2002 || Palomar || NEAT || — || align=right | 1.4 km || 
|-id=937 bgcolor=#E9E9E9
| 443937 ||  || — || October 4, 2002 || Apache Point || SDSS || — || align=right | 1.0 km || 
|-id=938 bgcolor=#E9E9E9
| 443938 ||  || — || October 5, 2002 || Apache Point || SDSS || MIS || align=right | 2.3 km || 
|-id=939 bgcolor=#E9E9E9
| 443939 ||  || — || September 15, 2002 || Anderson Mesa || LONEOS || JUN || align=right | 1.3 km || 
|-id=940 bgcolor=#E9E9E9
| 443940 ||  || — || October 28, 2002 || Haleakala || NEAT || — || align=right | 1.8 km || 
|-id=941 bgcolor=#E9E9E9
| 443941 ||  || — || October 30, 2002 || Apache Point || SDSS || — || align=right | 1.3 km || 
|-id=942 bgcolor=#FA8072
| 443942 ||  || — || November 5, 2002 || Socorro || LINEAR || H || align=right data-sort-value="0.76" | 760 m || 
|-id=943 bgcolor=#E9E9E9
| 443943 ||  || — || November 5, 2002 || Socorro || LINEAR || — || align=right | 1.3 km || 
|-id=944 bgcolor=#fefefe
| 443944 ||  || — || November 7, 2002 || Socorro || LINEAR || — || align=right data-sort-value="0.71" | 710 m || 
|-id=945 bgcolor=#E9E9E9
| 443945 ||  || — || November 8, 2002 || Socorro || LINEAR || — || align=right | 2.3 km || 
|-id=946 bgcolor=#E9E9E9
| 443946 ||  || — || November 11, 2002 || Socorro || LINEAR || — || align=right | 2.1 km || 
|-id=947 bgcolor=#E9E9E9
| 443947 ||  || — || October 11, 1993 || Kitt Peak || Spacewatch || — || align=right | 2.4 km || 
|-id=948 bgcolor=#E9E9E9
| 443948 ||  || — || December 6, 2002 || Socorro || LINEAR || — || align=right | 3.2 km || 
|-id=949 bgcolor=#E9E9E9
| 443949 ||  || — || December 6, 2002 || Socorro || LINEAR || — || align=right | 2.7 km || 
|-id=950 bgcolor=#FA8072
| 443950 ||  || — || December 11, 2002 || Socorro || LINEAR || — || align=right data-sort-value="0.65" | 650 m || 
|-id=951 bgcolor=#fefefe
| 443951 ||  || — || January 4, 2003 || Socorro || LINEAR || — || align=right data-sort-value="0.79" | 790 m || 
|-id=952 bgcolor=#FA8072
| 443952 ||  || — || January 29, 2003 || Palomar || NEAT || — || align=right | 2.3 km || 
|-id=953 bgcolor=#fefefe
| 443953 ||  || — || February 19, 2003 || Palomar || NEAT || — || align=right | 1.1 km || 
|-id=954 bgcolor=#E9E9E9
| 443954 ||  || — || March 6, 2003 || Palomar || NEAT || — || align=right | 2.0 km || 
|-id=955 bgcolor=#fefefe
| 443955 ||  || — || March 10, 2003 || Kitt Peak || Spacewatch || — || align=right data-sort-value="0.84" | 840 m || 
|-id=956 bgcolor=#fefefe
| 443956 ||  || — || April 7, 2003 || Kitt Peak || Spacewatch || — || align=right data-sort-value="0.68" | 680 m || 
|-id=957 bgcolor=#fefefe
| 443957 ||  || — || April 29, 2003 || Kitt Peak || Spacewatch || NYS || align=right data-sort-value="0.63" | 630 m || 
|-id=958 bgcolor=#d6d6d6
| 443958 ||  || — || April 29, 2003 || Kitt Peak || Spacewatch || — || align=right | 2.6 km || 
|-id=959 bgcolor=#d6d6d6
| 443959 ||  || — || April 30, 2003 || Kitt Peak || Spacewatch || — || align=right | 2.0 km || 
|-id=960 bgcolor=#fefefe
| 443960 ||  || — || May 1, 2003 || Socorro || LINEAR || — || align=right | 1.3 km || 
|-id=961 bgcolor=#d6d6d6
| 443961 ||  || — || April 9, 2003 || Kitt Peak || Spacewatch || — || align=right | 2.5 km || 
|-id=962 bgcolor=#FA8072
| 443962 ||  || — || August 22, 2003 || Palomar || NEAT || — || align=right data-sort-value="0.68" | 680 m || 
|-id=963 bgcolor=#E9E9E9
| 443963 ||  || — || September 15, 2003 || Palomar || NEAT || — || align=right data-sort-value="0.83" | 830 m || 
|-id=964 bgcolor=#E9E9E9
| 443964 ||  || — || September 18, 2003 || Kitt Peak || Spacewatch || — || align=right data-sort-value="0.68" | 680 m || 
|-id=965 bgcolor=#E9E9E9
| 443965 ||  || — || September 17, 2003 || Socorro || LINEAR || — || align=right | 1.1 km || 
|-id=966 bgcolor=#E9E9E9
| 443966 ||  || — || September 18, 2003 || Kitt Peak || Spacewatch || — || align=right data-sort-value="0.71" | 710 m || 
|-id=967 bgcolor=#E9E9E9
| 443967 ||  || — || September 27, 2003 || Kitt Peak || Spacewatch || critical || align=right data-sort-value="0.68" | 680 m || 
|-id=968 bgcolor=#E9E9E9
| 443968 ||  || — || September 28, 2003 || Socorro || LINEAR || — || align=right data-sort-value="0.92" | 920 m || 
|-id=969 bgcolor=#fefefe
| 443969 ||  || — || September 17, 2003 || Palomar || NEAT || — || align=right | 1.1 km || 
|-id=970 bgcolor=#E9E9E9
| 443970 ||  || — || September 30, 2003 || Desert Eagle || W. K. Y. Yeung || — || align=right data-sort-value="0.54" | 540 m || 
|-id=971 bgcolor=#E9E9E9
| 443971 ||  || — || September 18, 2003 || Kitt Peak || Spacewatch || — || align=right data-sort-value="0.65" | 650 m || 
|-id=972 bgcolor=#FFC2E0
| 443972 ||  || — || October 5, 2003 || Socorro || LINEAR || AMO || align=right data-sort-value="0.44" | 440 m || 
|-id=973 bgcolor=#fefefe
| 443973 ||  || — || September 20, 2003 || Kitt Peak || Spacewatch || — || align=right | 1.1 km || 
|-id=974 bgcolor=#E9E9E9
| 443974 ||  || — || October 5, 2003 || Kitt Peak || Spacewatch || — || align=right | 1.0 km || 
|-id=975 bgcolor=#E9E9E9
| 443975 ||  || — || October 17, 2003 || Kitt Peak || Spacewatch || — || align=right | 1.8 km || 
|-id=976 bgcolor=#E9E9E9
| 443976 ||  || — || October 21, 2003 || Kitt Peak || Spacewatch || — || align=right | 1.0 km || 
|-id=977 bgcolor=#E9E9E9
| 443977 ||  || — || October 24, 2003 || Socorro || LINEAR || — || align=right data-sort-value="0.71" | 710 m || 
|-id=978 bgcolor=#E9E9E9
| 443978 ||  || — || October 25, 2003 || Socorro || LINEAR || — || align=right | 1.3 km || 
|-id=979 bgcolor=#E9E9E9
| 443979 ||  || — || September 28, 2003 || Kitt Peak || Spacewatch || (5) || align=right data-sort-value="0.65" | 650 m || 
|-id=980 bgcolor=#E9E9E9
| 443980 ||  || — || October 19, 2003 || Kitt Peak || Spacewatch || — || align=right data-sort-value="0.81" | 810 m || 
|-id=981 bgcolor=#E9E9E9
| 443981 ||  || — || October 22, 2003 || Apache Point || SDSS || (194) || align=right data-sort-value="0.65" | 650 m || 
|-id=982 bgcolor=#E9E9E9
| 443982 ||  || — || November 14, 2003 || Palomar || NEAT || (5) || align=right | 1.1 km || 
|-id=983 bgcolor=#E9E9E9
| 443983 ||  || — || November 19, 2003 || Socorro || LINEAR || EUN || align=right | 1.2 km || 
|-id=984 bgcolor=#E9E9E9
| 443984 ||  || — || November 19, 2003 || Catalina || CSS || — || align=right data-sort-value="0.98" | 980 m || 
|-id=985 bgcolor=#E9E9E9
| 443985 ||  || — || November 20, 2003 || Kitt Peak || Spacewatch || — || align=right data-sort-value="0.94" | 940 m || 
|-id=986 bgcolor=#E9E9E9
| 443986 ||  || — || November 20, 2003 || Socorro || LINEAR || — || align=right data-sort-value="0.87" | 870 m || 
|-id=987 bgcolor=#E9E9E9
| 443987 ||  || — || November 20, 2003 || Campo Imperatore || CINEOS || — || align=right | 1.0 km || 
|-id=988 bgcolor=#E9E9E9
| 443988 ||  || — || November 20, 2003 || Socorro || LINEAR || — || align=right | 1.2 km || 
|-id=989 bgcolor=#E9E9E9
| 443989 ||  || — || November 20, 2003 || Socorro || LINEAR || — || align=right | 1.1 km || 
|-id=990 bgcolor=#E9E9E9
| 443990 ||  || — || November 21, 2003 || Socorro || LINEAR || — || align=right | 1.1 km || 
|-id=991 bgcolor=#E9E9E9
| 443991 ||  || — || November 21, 2003 || Socorro || LINEAR || — || align=right | 1.1 km || 
|-id=992 bgcolor=#FA8072
| 443992 ||  || — || November 29, 2003 || Kingsnake || J. V. McClusky || — || align=right data-sort-value="0.94" | 940 m || 
|-id=993 bgcolor=#E9E9E9
| 443993 ||  || — || December 1, 2003 || Socorro || LINEAR || — || align=right data-sort-value="0.98" | 980 m || 
|-id=994 bgcolor=#E9E9E9
| 443994 ||  || — || December 5, 2003 || Socorro || LINEAR || — || align=right | 1.6 km || 
|-id=995 bgcolor=#FA8072
| 443995 ||  || — || December 14, 2003 || Palomar || NEAT || — || align=right data-sort-value="0.98" | 980 m || 
|-id=996 bgcolor=#E9E9E9
| 443996 ||  || — || December 16, 2003 || Catalina || CSS || EUN || align=right | 1.3 km || 
|-id=997 bgcolor=#E9E9E9
| 443997 ||  || — || December 17, 2003 || Kitt Peak || Spacewatch || — || align=right | 1.4 km || 
|-id=998 bgcolor=#E9E9E9
| 443998 ||  || — || December 17, 2003 || Kitt Peak || Spacewatch || — || align=right | 1.6 km || 
|-id=999 bgcolor=#E9E9E9
| 443999 ||  || — || December 16, 2003 || Kitt Peak || Spacewatch || — || align=right data-sort-value="0.94" | 940 m || 
|-id=000 bgcolor=#E9E9E9
| 444000 ||  || — || December 17, 2003 || Kitt Peak || Spacewatch || — || align=right data-sort-value="0.83" | 830 m || 
|}

References

External links 
 Discovery Circumstances: Numbered Minor Planets (440001)–(445000) (IAU Minor Planet Center)

0443